2016 in sports describes the year's events in world sport. The main highlight for this year is the 2016 Olympic and Paralympic Games in Rio de Janeiro.

Calendar by month 
 January
 February
 March
 April
 May
 June
 July
 August
 September
 October
 November
 December

Air sports

Alpine skiing

Amateur boxing

American football

 Super Bowl 50 – the Denver Broncos (AFC) won 24–10 over the Carolina Panthers (NFC)
Location: Levi's Stadium
Attendance: 71,088
MVP: Von Miller, LB (Denver)

Aquatics

Archery
 November 21, 2015 – September 17, 2016: 2015–16 World Archery Federation Events Page

2016 Summer Olympics (WA)
 August 5 – 12: 2016 Summer Olympics in  Rio de Janeiro at the Sambadrome Marquês de Sapucaí
 Men's individual:   Ku Bon-chan;   Jean-Charles Valladont;   Brady Ellison
 Men's team:  ;  ;  
 Women's individual:   Chang Hye-jin;   Lisa Unruh;   Ki Bo-bae
 Women's team:  ;  ;

Indoor archery
 November 21 & 22, 2015: IA World Cup #1 in  Marrakesh (junior & senior individual events)
  and  won 2 gold medals each.  won the overall medal tally.
 December 9 & 10, 2015: IA World Cup #2 in  Bangkok (senior individual events only)
 Men's Recurve winner:  Brady Ellison
 Women's Recurve winner:  Aída Román
 Men's Compound winner:  Reo Wilde
 Women's Compound winner:  Toja Cerne
 January 15 – 17: IA World Cup #3 in  Nîmes (junior & senior individual events)
 Men's Recurve winner:  Luca Melotto
 Women's Recurve winner:  Guendalina Sartori
 Men's Compound winner:  Braden Gellenthien
 Women's Compound winner:  Linda Ochoa-Anderson
  and  won 2 gold medals each. Italy won the overall medal tally.
 January 29 – 31: IA World Cup #4 (final) in  Las Vegas
 Men's Recurve winner:  Brady Ellison
 Women's Recurve winner:  Khatuna Lorig
 Men's Compound winner:  Jesse Broadwater
 Women's Compound winner:  Sarah Holst Sonnichsen
 March 1 – 6: 2016 World Indoor Archery Championships in  Ankara
  won both the gold and overall medal tallies.

Outdoor archery
 January 28 – 31: 2016 African Archery Championships in  Windhoek
  won both the gold and overall medal tallies.
 April 26 – May 1: WA World Cup #1 in  Shanghai
 Men's Recurve winner:  Sjef van den Berg
 Women's Recurve winner:  JU Hye-bhin
 Men's Compound winner:  Mike Schloesser
 Women's Compound winner:  Sara López
 May 9 – 15: WA World Cup #2 in  Medellín
 Men's Recurve winner:  Brady Ellison
 Women's Recurve winner:  Choi Mi-sun
 Men's Compound winner:  Sergio Pagni
 Women's Compound winner:  Sara López
 May 23 – 29: 2016 European Archery Championships in  Nottingham
 Men's Recurve winner:  Jean-Charles Valladont
 Women's Recurve winner:  Veronika Marchenko
 Men's Compound winner:  Stephan Hansen
 Women's Compound winner:  Sarah Prieels
 June 1 – 5: World University Archery Championship in  Ulaanbaatar
 Men's Recurve winner:  Galsan Bazarzhapov
 Women's Recurve winner:  Kang Chae-young
 Men's Compound winner:  Kim Jong-ho
 Women's Compound winner:  Ko Soyoung
 June 13 – 19: WA World Cup #3 in  Antalya
 Men's Recurve winner:  Lee Seung-yun
 Women's Recurve winner:  Choi Mi-sun
 Men's Compound winner:  Evren Çağıran
 Women's Compound winner:  Sara López
 September 24 & 25: WA World Cup #4 (final) in  Odense
 Men's Recurve winner:  Brady Ellison
 Women's Recurve winner:  Ki Bo-bae
 Men's Compound winner:  Mike Schloesser
 Women's Compound winner:  Marcella Tonioli
 Mixed Team Recurve winners: 
 Mixed Team Compound winners: 
 September 27 – October 2: 2016 World Archery Field Championships in  Dublin
  and the  won 5 gold medals each. Italy won the overall medal tally.

Association football

Athletics (track and field)

Badminton

Bandy

Baseball

Major League Baseball
 April 3 – October 2: 2016 Major League Baseball season
 American League winner:  Cleveland Indians
 National League winner:  Chicago Cubs
 June 9 – 11: 2016 Major League Baseball draft in  Secaucus, New Jersey
 #1 pick:  Mickey Moniak to the  Philadelphia Phillies from  La Costa Canyon High School
 July 12: 2016 Major League Baseball All-Star Game in  San Diego at Petco Park
 Winners: American League
 MVP:  Eric Hosmer ( Kansas City Royals)
 Home Run Derby:  Giancarlo Stanton ( Miami Marlins)
 October 25 – November 2: 2016 World Series
 The  Chicago Cubs defeated the  Cleveland Indians, 4–3 in games played, to win their third World Series title.  Notably, this ended the longest championship drought in the history of North American sports at 108 years.

WBSC
 July 29 – August 7: 2016 WBSC 15U Baseball World Cup in  Iwaki, Fukushima
  defeated , 9–4, to win their second consecutive and sixth overall WBSC 15U Baseball World Cup title.
 The  took the bronze medal.
 September 3 – 11: 2016 Women's Baseball World Cup in  Gijang County (Busan)
  defeated , 10–0, to win their fifth consecutive Women's Baseball World Cup title.
  took the bronze medal.
 October 28 – November 6: 2016 23U Baseball World Cup in  Monterrey (replaces the 21U Baseball World Cup)
  defeated , 10–3, to win their first 23U Baseball World Cup title.
  took the bronze medal.

Little League Baseball
 July 26 – August 2: 2016 Big League World Series in  Easley, South Carolina
  Tao-Yuan County Big LL (Team Asia-Pacific) defeated  Kihei LL (Team West), 6–2, in the final.
 July 31 – August 6: 2016 Senior League World Series in  Bangor, Maine
  Clear Ridge LL (Team Central) defeated  Southern Mariners LL (Team Asia-Pacific), 7–2, in the final.
 July 31 – August 7: 2016 Little League Intermediate (50/70) World Series in  Livermore, California
  Central East Maui LL (Team West) defeated  West Seoul LL (Team Asia-Pacific), 5–1, in the final.
 August 14 – 21: 2016 Junior League World Series in  Taylor, Michigan
  Shing-Ming Junior LL (Team Asia-Pacific) defeated  Kawaihau Community LL (Team West), 9–1, in the final.
 August 18 – 28: 2016 Little League World Series in  South Williamsport, Pennsylvania
  Maine-Endwell Little League (Team Mid-Atlantic) defeated  East Seoul Little League (Team Asia-Pacific and Middle East), 2–1, in the final.

Basketball

2016 Summer Olympics (FIBA)
 January 15 – 17: Aquece Rio International Women's Basketball Tournament in  Rio de Janeiro (Olympic Test Event)
 Overall,  defeated  in the final standings.  took the bronze medal.
 August 6 – 21: 2016 Summer Olympics in  Rio de Janeiro at the Olympic Training Center
 Men:   United States;  ;  
 Women:  ;  ;

International FIBA championships
 June 1 – 5: 2016 FIBA 3x3 Under-18 World Championships in  Astana
 Men:  defeated , 20–12, in the final.  took the bronze medal.
 June 13 – 19: 2016 FIBA World Olympic Qualifying Tournament for Women in  Nantes
 June 22 – July 3: 2016 FIBA Under-17 World Championship for Men and Women in  Zaragoza
 Men: The  defeated , 96–56, to win their fourth consecutive FIBA Under-17 World Championship title.
  took third place.
 Women:  defeated , 62–38, to win their first FIBA Under-17 World Championship for Women title.
 The  took third place.
 July 4 – 9: FIBA Men's Olympic Qualifying Tournament #1 in  Turin
  has qualified to compete at Rio 2016.
 July 4 – 9: FIBA Men's Olympic Qualifying Tournament #2 in  Belgrade
  has qualified to compete at Rio 2016.
 July 5 – 10: FIBA Men's Olympic Qualifying Tournament #3 in  Manila
  has qualified to compete at Rio 2016.
 August 6 & 7: 2016 FIBA 3x3 Open Pacific Championships in  Gold Coast, Queensland
  defeated  NSW, 11–9, in the final.
 October 11 – 15: 2016 FIBA 3x3 World Championships in  Guangzhou
 Women: The  defeated , 21–11, in the final. The  took third place.

NBA
 October 27, 2015 – April 13, 2016: 2015–16 NBA season
 Top regular season team:  Golden State Warriors
 MVP:  Stephen Curry ( Golden State Warriors)
 February 14: 2016 NBA All-Star Game at the Air Canada Centre in  Toronto
 Note: This NBA All-Star Game was held outside the United States for the first time.
 The Western Conference (NBA) defeat the Eastern Conference (NBA) 196–173.
 MVP:  Russell Westbrook ( Oklahoma City Thunder)
 NBA All-Star Celebrity Game: Team  defeated Team  74–64.
 Rising Stars Challenge: Team USA defeated Team  World 157–154.
 NBA All-Star Weekend Skills Challenge winner:  Karl-Anthony Towns ( Minnesota Timberwolves)
 Three-Point Contest winner:  Klay Thompson ( Golden State Warriors)
 Slam Dunk Contest winner:  Zach LaVine ( Minnesota Timberwolves)
 April 16 – June 19: 2016 NBA Playoffs
 The  Cleveland Cavaliers defeated the  Golden State Warriors, 4–3 in games played, to win their first NBA title.
 MVP:  LeBron James (Cleveland Cavaliers)
 June 23: 2016 NBA draft at the Barclays Center in Brooklyn (New York City)
 #1 pick:  Ben Simmons to the  Philadelphia 76ers from  LSU

WNBA
 April 14: 2016 WNBA draft at the Mohegan Sun Arena in Uncasville, Connecticut
 #1:  Breanna Stewart, from the  Connecticut Huskies, to the  Seattle Storm
 May 14 – September 18: 2016 WNBA season
 Eastern Conference Winners:  New York Liberty
 Western Conference Winners:  Minnesota Lynx
 September 21 – October 20: 2016 WNBA Playoffs
 The  Los Angeles Sparks defeated the  Minnesota Lynx, 3–2 in games played, to win their third WNBA championship title.

NCAA
 March 15 – April 4: 2016 NCAA Men's Division I Basketball Tournament (Final four at NRG Stadium in Houston)
 The  Villanova Wildcats defeated the  North Carolina Tar Heels, 77–74, to win their second NCAA Men's Division I Basketball title.
 Most Outstanding Player:  Ryan Arcidiacono (Villanova)
 March 19 – April 5: 2016 NCAA Women's Division I Basketball Tournament (Final four at Bankers Life Fieldhouse in Indianapolis)
 The  Connecticut Huskies defeated the  Syracuse Orange, 82–51, to win their fourth consecutive and 11th overall NCAA Women's Division I Basketball Tournament title. The title was also the 11th for Huskies head coach Geno Auriemma, putting him ahead of John Wooden for the most Division I national titles for a head coach in either men's or women's basketball.
 Most Outstanding Player:  Breanna Stewart (Connecticut)

FIBA Americas
 January 15 – March 12: 2016 FIBA Americas League
  Guaros de Lara defeated  Bauru, 84–79, to win their first FIBA Americas League title.  Mogi das Cruzes took third place.
 May 20 – 26: 2016 South American Basketball Championship for Women in  Barquisimeto
  defeated , 94–75, to win their 16th consecutive and 26th overall South American Basketball Championship for Women title.  took the bronze medal.
 June 19 – 25: 2016 Centrobasket in  Panama City
  defeated , 84–83, to win their 11th Centrobasket title.  took third place.
 June 26 – July 2: 2016 South American Basketball Championship for Men in  Caracas
  defeated , 64–58, to win their second consecutive and third overall South American Basketball Championship title.
  took third place.
 July 3 – 16: 2016 CBC U16 Championship in  Georgetown, Guyana
 Men: The  defeated , 84–57, to win the inaugural FIBA CBC U16 Championship title.  took third place.
 Women: The  defeated , 55–50, to win the inaugural Women's FIBA CBC U16 Championship title.  took third place.
 July 13 – 23: 2016 FIBA Americas Under-18 Championship for Men and Women in  Valdivia
 Men: The  defeated , 99–84, to win their fourth consecutive and eighth overall FIBA Americas Under-18 Championship title.
  took third place.
 Women: The  defeated , 109–62, to win their eighth consecutive and ninth overall FIBA Americas Under-18 Championship title.
  took third place.
 August 24 – 28: 2016 Centrobasket U15 Championship in  Patillas, Puerto Rico
 August 29 – September 2: 2016 COCABA U16 Championship for Men and Women in  San José, Costa Rica
 Men: 1. ; 2. ; 3. 
 Women: 1. ; 2. ; 3. 
 September 20 – December 7: 2016 South American League for Men's Clubs in  Comodoro Rivadavia and La Banda,  Valdivia, and  Barquisimeto
  Mogi das Cruzes defeated  Weber Bahía, 3–0 in games played, in the final.
 October 25 – 29: 2016 South American U15 Championship for Men in  Asunción
  defeated , 69–60, in the final.  took third place.
 November 16 – 20: 2016 FIBA South America Under-15 Championship for Women in  Guayaquil
  defeated , 65–54, to win their sixth FIBA South America Under-15 Championship for Women title.
  took third place.

FIBA Europe
 October 5, 2015 – May 15, 2016: 2015–16 Euroleague
  CSKA Moscow defeated  Fenerbahçe, 101–96 in overtime, to win their seventh Euroleague title.  Lokomotiv Kuban took third place.
 October 7, 2015 – April 13, 2016: 2015–16 EuroCup Women
  CJM Bourges Basket defeated fellow French team, ESB Villeneuve-d'Ascq, 105–93 in two matches, to win their first EuroCup Women title.
 October 13, 2015 – April 27, 2016: 2015–16 Eurocup Basketball
  Galatasaray Odeabank defeated  Strasbourg IG, 140–133 on aggregate, to win their first Eurocup Basketball title.
 October 14, 2015 – April 17, 2016: 2015–16 EuroLeague Women
  UMMC Ekaterinburg defeated fellow Russian team, Nadezhda Orenburg, 72–69, to win their third EuroLeague Women title.  Fenerbahçe took third place.
 October 21, 2015 – May 1, 2016: 2015–16 FIBA Europe Cup (debut event and replaced the EuroChallenge)
  Skyliners Frankfurt defeated  Pallacanestro Varese, 66–62, to win the inaugural FIBA Europe Cup title.  Élan Chalon took third place.
 June 26 – July 3: 2016 FIBA European Championship for Small Countries in  Chișinău
  defeated , 79–71, to win their first FIBA European Championship for Small Countries title.
  took third place.
 June 28 – July 3: 2016 FIBA Women's European Championship for Small Countries in 
  defeated , 67–59, to win their third FIBA Women's European Championship for Small Countries title.
  took third place.
 July 9 – 17: 2016 FIBA Europe Under-20 Championship for Women in  Matosinhos
  defeated , 71–69, to win their second consecutive and sixth overall FIBA Europe Under-20 Championship for Women title.
  took third place.
 July 16 – 24: 2016 FIBA Europe Under-20 Championship in  Helsinki
  defeated , 68–55, to win their second FIBA Europe Under-20 Championship title.
  took third place.
 July 23 – 31: 2016 FIBA Europe Under-18 Championship for Women in  Sopron
  defeated , 74–44, to win their second FIBA Europe Under-18 Championship for Women title.
  took third place.
 August 6 – 14: 2016 FIBA Europe Under-16 Championship for Women in  Udine
  defeated , 64–48, to win their tenth FIBA Europe Under-16 Championship for Women title.
  took third place.
 August 12 – 20: 2016 FIBA Europe Under-16 Championship in  Radom
  defeated , 74–72, to win their fourth FIBA Europe Under-16 Championship title. 
  took third place.
 September 2 – 4: 2016 FIBA 3x3 European Championships in  Bucharest
 Men:  defeated  19–17, to win their first FIBA 3x3 European Championships title. The  took third place.
 Women:  defeated , 21–14, to win their first FIBA Women's 3x3 European Championships title.  took third place.
 September 9 – 11: 2016 FIBA U18 3x3 European Championships in  Debrecen
 Men:  defeated , 19–15, in the final.  took third place.
 Women:  defeated , 11–10, in the final. The  took third place.
 December 16 – 22: 2016 FIBA Europe Under-18 Championship in  Samsun
 Note: This event was temporarily postponed, due to the aftermath of the 2016 Turkish coup d'état attempt.
  defeated , 75–68, to win their fourth FIBA Europe Under-18 Championship title.
  took third place.

FIBA Asia
 July 22 – 31: 2016 FIBA Asia Under-18 Championship in  Tehran
  defeated , 71–65, to win their third FIBA Asia Under-18 Championship title. 
  took third place.
 September 9 – 18: 2016 FIBA Asia Challenge in  Tehran
  defeated , 77–47, to win their third consecutive FIBA Asia Challenge title. 
  took third place.
 October 8 – 16: 2016 FIBA Asia Champions Cup in  Chenzhou
  China Kashgar defeated  Al-Riyadi, 96–88, to win their first FIBA Asia Champions Cup title.
  Petrochimi took third place.
 November 13 – 20: 2016 FIBA Asia Under-18 Championship for Women in  Bangkok
  defeated , 78–47, to win their fourth consecutive and 15th overall FIBA Asia Under-18 Championship for Women title.
  took third place.

FIBA Africa
 July 22 – 31: 2016 FIBA Africa Under-18 Championship for Men in  Kigali
  defeated , 86–82, to win their fourth FIBA Africa Under-18 Championship title.
  took third place.
 August 26 – September 4: 2016 FIBA Africa Under-18 Championship for Women in  Cairo
  defeated , 84–61, to win their second consecutive and sixth overall FIBA Africa Under-18 Championship for Women title.
  took third place.

FIBA Oceania
 December 5 – 10: 2016 FIBA Oceania Under-18 Championship for Men and Women in  Suva
 Men:  defeated , 57–51, to win their first Men's FIBA Oceania Under-18 Championship title.
  took third place.
 Women:  defeated , 107–52, to win their seventh consecutive Women's FIBA Oceania Under-18 Championship title.
  took third place.

Beach volleyball

Biathlon

BMX racing

Bobsleigh and skeleton

Boccia
 March 19 – 26: BISFed 2016 World Individual Championships in  Beijing
 Individual BC1 winner:  Pattaya Tadtong
 Individual BC2 winner:  Worawut Saengampa
 Individual BC3 winner:  Jeong Ho-won
 Individual BC4 winner:  Stephen McGuire
 April 26 – May 2: BISFed 2016 World Open #1 in  Montreal
 Individual BC1 winner:  Lee Dong-won
 Individual BC2 winner:  Lee Young-jin
 Individual BC3 winner:  Jeong Ho-won
 Individual BC4 winner:  Seo Hyeon-seok
 Pairs BC3 winners: 
 Pairs BC4 winners: 
 Team BC1–BC2 winners: 
 May 17 – 24: BISFed 2016 World Open #2 in  Dubai
 Individual BC1 winner:  LEUNG Mei Yee
 Individual BC2 winner:  Abilio Valente
 Individual BC3 winner:  HO Yuen Kei
 Individual BC4 winner:  Samuel Andrejcik
 Pairs BC3 winners: 
 Pairs BC4 winners: 
 Team BC1–BC2 winners: 
 June 14 – 19: BISFed 2016 World Open #3 in  Póvoa de Varzim
 Individual BC1 winner:  David Smith
 Individual BC2 winner:  Maciel de Sousa Santos
 Individual BC3 winner:  José Carlos Macedo
 Individual BC4 winner:  Samuel Andrejcik
 Pairs BC3 winners: 
 Pairs BC4 winners: 
 Team BC1-BC2 winners:

Bowling

Canadian football
November 27 – 104th Grey Cup: Ottawa Redblacks defeat Calgary Stampeders, 39–33 (in overtime).

Canoeing

Chess
 February 10 – December 18: 2016 FIDE (World Chess Federation) calendar

World events 
 February 10 – 24, 2016: FIDE Women's Grand Prix #2 in  Tehran
 Winner:  Ju Wenjun
 April 19 – May 3, 2016: FIDE Women's Grand Prix #3 in  Batumi
 Winner:  Valentina Gunina
 July 1 – 15: FIDE Women's Grand Prix #4 in  Chengdu
 Winner:  Harika Dronavalli
 November 18 – December 2: FIDE Women's Grand Prix #5 in  Khanty-Mansiysk
 Winner:  Ju Wenjun
 February 25 – March 3: IMSA Elite Mind Games in  Huai'an
 Winners of rapid chess:  Shakhriyar Mamedyarov (m) /  Tan Zhongyi
 Winners of blitz chess:  Rauf Mamedov (m) /  Kateryna Lagno (f)
 Winners of Basque chess:  Ding Liren (m) /  Alexandra Kosteniuk (f)
 March 1 – 19: Women's World Chess Championship 2016 in  Lviv
 Winner:  Hou Yifan
 March 10 – 30: Candidates Tournament in  Moscow
 Winner:  Sergey Karjakin
 April 8 – 15: 14th World University Chess Championship in  Abu Dhabi
 Winners:  Hovhannes Gabuzyan (m) /  Ni Shiqun (f)
 April 18 – 28: World Amateur Chess Championship 2016 in  Chalkidiki
 Under 2300 winner:  Zhuban Bigabylov
 Under 2000 winner:  Enkhsaikhan Khulan
 Under 1700 winner:  Jatin SN
 May 17 – 25: 2016 ICCD World Individual Deaf Chess Championships in  Yerevan
 Men's winner:  Duilio Collutiis
 Junior men winner:  Mikhail Petrenko
 Women's winner:  Tatiana Baklanova
 June 26 – July 4: World Senior Team Chess Championship 50+, 65+ 2016 in  Dresden
 50+ winners:  (Uwe Bönsch, Klaus Bischoff, Karsten Volke, Raj Tischbierek, Gernot Gauglitz)
 65+ winners:  (Evgeny Sveshnikov, Evgeni Vasiukov, Yuri Balashov, Vladimir V. Zhelnin, Nikolai Pushkov)
 Women's winners:  (Galina Strutinskaia, Svetlana Mednikova, Valentina Kozlovskaya, Elena Fatalibekova, Elena N. Sazonova)
 July 22 – 29: World Youth U-16 Chess Olympiad 2016 in  Poprad
 Winners: 
 July 30 – August 7: Commonwealth Chess Championship 2016 in  Wadduwa
 Winnesr:  Abhijeet Gupta (m) /  Tania Sachdev (f)
 U8 winner:  P. Das Swayham (m) / A. N. Shefali (f)
 U10 winners:  D. Gukesh (m) /  Sanskruti Wankhede (f)
 U12 winners:  Malan Pathirana (m) /  Narayani Adane(f)
 U14 winners:  P. Iniyan (m) /  Meenal Gupta (f)
 U16 winners:  Minul Sanjula Doluweera (m) /  Hagawane Aakanksha
 U18 winners:  Sarkar Rajdeep (m) /  Mohanty Smaraki
 U20 winners:  Roland Bezuidenhout (m) /  P. V. Nandhidhaa
 Senior winner:  Richard Voon 
 August 7 – 21: World Junior Chess Championships 2016 in  Bhubaneswar
 Winners:  Jeffery Xiong (m) /  Dinara Saduakassova (f)
 September 1 – 14: 42nd Chess Olympiad in  Baku
 Open winners:  (Fabiano Caruana, Hikaru Nakamura, Wesley So, Sam Shankland, Ray Robson)
 Women's winners:  (Hou Yifan, Ju Wenjun, Zhao Xue, Tan Zhongyi, Guo Qi)
 September 20 – October 4: World Youth U14, U16, U18 Championships 2016 in  Khanty-Mansiysk
 U14 winners:  Semen Lomasov (m) /  Zhu Jiner (f)
 U16 winners:  Haik M. Martirosyan (m) /  Aakanksha Hagawane (f)
 U18 winners:  Manuel Petrosyan (m) /  Stavroula Tsolakidou (f)
 October 18 – 31: World Cadets U8, U10, U12 Championships 2016 in  Batumi
 U8 winners:  Shageldi Kurbandurdyew (m) /  Aisha Zakirova (f)
 U10 winners:  Ilya Makoveev (m) /  Rochelle Wu (f)
 U12 winners:  Nikhil Kumar (m) /  Bibisara Assaubayeva (f)
 November 11–30: World Chess Championship 2016: Carlsen – Karjakin in  New York City
  Magnus Carlsen defeated  Sergey Karjakin, 9–7.
 November 18 – December 1: World Senior Chess Championships 2016 in  Mariánské Lázně
 50+ winners:  Giorgi Bagaturov (m) /  Tatiana Bogumil (f)
 65+ winners:  Anatoly Vaisser (m) /  Nona Gaprindashvili (f)

European events
 April 1 – 11: 2nd European Small Nations Individual Chess Championship in  Luxembourg City
 Winner:  Helgi Dam Ziska
 April 18 – 27: European Senior Team Chess Championship 2016 in 
 Seniors 50+ winners:  (Alon Greenfeld, Yehuda Gruenfeld, Alexander Huzman, Ram Soffer)
 Seniors 65+ winners:  (Yuri Balashov, Nikolai M Mishuchkov, Nikolai Pushkov, Evgeni Vasiukov, Vladimir V Zhelnin)
 May 11 – 24: European Individual Chess Championship 2016 in  Gjakova
 Winner:  Ernesto Inarkiev
 May 26 – June 8: European Individual Women's Chess Championship 2016 in  Mamaia
 Winner:  Anna Ushenina
 June 4 – 14: European Senior Individual Championship 2016 in 
 50+ winners:  Zurab Sturua (m) /  Galina Strutinskaia (f)
 65+ winners:  Valentin Bogdanov (m) /  Nona Gaprindashvili (f)
 June 6 – 12: European Amateur Chess Championship 2016 in  Ruzomberok
 Winner:  Anatoly Borodavkin
 June 16 – 26: European School Chess Championship 2016 in  Chalkidiki
 U7 winners:  Ziya Mammadov (m) /  Sofya Svergina (f)
 U9 winners:  Taha Ozkan (m) /  Alexandra Shvedova (f)
 U11 winners:  Isik Can (m) /  Margarita Zvereva (f)
 U13 winners:  Ilie Martinovici (m) /  Alexandra Afanasieva (f)
 U15 winners:  Toivo Keinanen (m) /  Alexandra Obolentseva (f)
 U17 winner:  Timur Trubchaninov (m) /  Anastasia Avramidou (f)
 July 9 – 17: European Youth Team Chess Championship 2016 in  Celje
 Men's winners: 
 Women's winners: 
 July 13 – 24: European Universities Games 2016 in  Zagreb
 Winners:  Hovhannes Gabuzyan (m) /  Adela Velikić
 Blitz winners:  Zaven Andriasian (m) /  Anastasia Travkina
 July 24 – August 1: 1st IBCA European Team Chess Championship in  Warsawa
 Winners:  1
 August 3 – 11: 2016 EU Youth Championships in  Mureck
 EU U8 winner:  Simeon Todev
 EU U10 winner:  Vesna Mihelič
 EU U12 winner:  Momchil Petkov
 EU U14 winner:  Maximilian Paul Maetzkow
 August 17 – 28: European Youth Chess Championship 2016 in  Prague
 U8 winners:  Artem Pingin (m) /  Alexandra Shvedova (f)
 U10 winners:  Volodar Murzin (m) /  Zsóka Gaál (f)
 U12 winners:  Mamikon Gharibyan (m) /  Sila Çağlar (f)
 U14 winners:  Salvador Guerra Rivera (m) /  Aleksandra Maltsevskaya (f)
 U16 winners:  Timur Fakhrutdinov (m) /  Fiona Sieber (f)
 U18 winners:  Manuel Petrosyan (m) /  Nino Khomeriki (f)
 November 5 – 13: European Chess Club Cup 2016 for men and for women  Novi Sad
 Winners:  Alkaloid (m) /  Cercle d’Echecs Monte Carlo 
 December 14 – 18: European Rapid and Blitz Chess Championships 2016 in  Tallinn
 December 26 – 30: European Youth Rapid and Blitz Chess Championships 2016 in  Novi Sad

American events
 February 19 – 28: American Continental Women's Championship in  Lima
 Winner:  Deysi Cori
 March 24 – 29: CARIFTA Chess Championships U20 in  Saint Croix
 U20 winners:  Orlando Husbands (m) /  Annelaine Jacobs (f)
 U18 winners:  Yu Tien Poon (m) /  Hazel Acosta (f)
 U16 winners:  Alan-Safar Ramoutar (m) /  Catherine Kaslan (f)
 U14 winners:  Alan-Safar Ramoutar (m) /  Catherine Kaslan (f)
 U12 winners:  Nathan Smith (m) /  Azaria Jonhson (f)
 U10 winners:  Kishan Clarke (m) /  Thamara Sagastegui (f)
 U8 winner:  Jayden Barry
 April 27 – May 3: American Subzonal 2.3.5 Open & Women in  Bridgetown
 Winners:  Mark Machin Rivera (m) /  Deborah Richards (f)
 May 28 – June 5: 11th American Continental Chess Championship in  San Salvador
 Winner:  Emilio Córdova Daza
 June 19 – 26: Panamerican U20 Chess Championship 2016 in  Bogotà
 Winners:  Luis Paulo Supi (m) /  Lilia Ivonne Fuentes Godoy (f)
 July 1 – 6: Panamerican University Championship 2016 in  Tegucigalpa
 Winners:  Mattey Emanuel Vaglio (m) /  Maria Elena Rodriguez Arrieta (f)
 July 11 – 18: Central American & Caribbean Junior U20 Chess Championships 2016 in  San Salvador
 Winners:  Bryan Solano Cuya (m) /  Karla July Fernandez Rivero (f)
 July 24 – 31: Panamerican Youth Festival 2016 in  Montevideo
 U8 winners:  Marvin Gao (m) /  Sophie Velea (f)
 U10 winners:  Diego Saul Rod Flores Quillas (m) /  Rianne Ke (f)
 U12 winners:  Arthur Guo (m) /  Nastassja A Matus (f)
 U14 winners:  German Gonzalo Quirhuayo Chumbe (m) /  Melanie Dongo (f)
 U16 winners:  Julian Villca (m) /  Angie Gabriela Velasquez (f)
 U18 winners:  Franco Villegas (m) /  Nataly A Monroy G (f)
 August 7 – 11: North American Youth Chess Championship 2016 in 
 U8 winners:  Kevin Zhong (m) /  Sophie Velea (f)
 U10 winners:  Rohun Trakru (m) /  Atmika Gorti (f)
 U12 winners:  Nicholas Vettese (m) /  Claire Cao (f)
 U14 winners:  Aaron Shlionsky (m) /  Sasha Konovalenko (f)
 U16 winners:  Zhaozhi Li (m) /  Svitlana Demchenko (f)
 U18 winner:  Michael Song (m) /  Maili-Jade Ouellet (f)
 August 15 – 22: Central American & Caribbean Youth Chess Championships 2016 in  Caracas
  won both the gold and overall medal tallies.
 October 2 – 9: Panamerican Schools Chess Championship 2016 in  Lima
 U7 winners:  Matias Vincent Lima Cardenas (m) /  Maria Fernanda Herrada Blanco (f)
 U9 winners:  Nicola Forno Trujillo (m) /  Fiorella Contreras (f)
 U11 winners:  Diego Saul Rod Flores Quillas (m) /  Julia Dennis Figueroa Bernal (f)
 U13 winners:  Ivan Excen Soriano Quispe (m) /  Nicole Celestino (f)
 U15 winners:  Junior Zambrano (m) /  Mitzy Mishell Caballero Quijano (f)
 U17 winners:  Kevin Joel Cori Quispe (m) /  Blanca Solis Chimoy (f)
 October 25 – 30: Panamerican Amateur Chess Championship in  Buenos Aires
 Sub 1700 winner:  Juan Dalmas Muzi
 Sub 2000 winner:  Nelson Lujan
 Sub 2300 winner:  Renzo Gutiérrez
 Blitz winner:  Cristian Sanhueza
 October 31 – November 6: American Subzonal 2.3.3 in  Panama City
 Winners:  Bernal González (m) /  Maria Elena Rodriguez Arrieta (f)
 November 6 – 13: American Continental Women's Championship in  Colima City
 Winner:  Deysi Cori
 December 1 – 6: South American Youth Festival 2016 in  Santiago
 U8 winners:  Santiago Lopez Rayo (m) /  Mirella Pedro Tereza (f)
 U10 winners:  Axl Severich (m) /  Juana Rueda Nessi (f)
 U12 winners:  Jose Gabriel Cardoso Cardoso (m) /  Arianna Sofia Arauco Celestino (f)
 U14 winners:  Flavio Gonzales Curse (m) /  Stephanie Beatriz Puppi Lazo (f)
 U16 winners:  Lucas Coro (m) /  Mitzy Mishell Caballero Quijano (f)
 U18 winners:  Franco Villegas (m) /  Anahi Ortiz Verdesoto (f)

Asian events
 March 27 – April 8: Asian Nations Cup (Men and Women) 2016 in  Abu Dhabi
 Men's winners:  (Baskaran Adhiban, S. P. Sethuraman, Vidit Santosh Gujrathi, Krishnan Sasikiran, Deep Sengupta)
 Women's winners:  (Ju Wenjun, Tan Zhongyi, Lei Tingjie, Guo Qi, Zhao Xue)
 April 6: Asian Nations Cup Rapid Championship 2016 in  Abu Dhabi
 Men's winner:  (Wang Yue, Bu Xiangzhi, Zhou Jianchao, Wei Yi, Lu Shanglei)
 Women's winner:  (Ju Wenjun, Tan Zhongyi, Zhao Xue, Lei Tingjie, Guo Qi)
 April 7: Asian Nations Cup Blitz Championship 2016 in  Abu Dhabi
 Men's winner:  (Wang Yue, Bu Xiangzhi, Zhou Jianchao, Wei Yi, Lu Shanglei)
 Women's winner:  (Ju Wenjun, Tan Zhongyi, Zhao Xue, Lei Tingjie, Guo Qi)
 April 5 – 15: Asian Youth U6, U8, 10, 12, 14, 16, 18 Championship 2016 in  Ulaanbaatar
 U6 winners:  Khumoyun Begmuratov (m) /  Gantsolmon Enkh-Uyanga (f)
 U8 winners:  Artin Ashraf (m) /  Tôn Nữ Quỳnh Dương (f)
 U10 winners:  Ochirbat Lkhagvajamts (m) /  Davaakhuu Munkhzul (f)
 U12 winners:  R. Praggnanandhaa (m) /  Divya Deshmukh (f)
 U14 winners:  Nodirbek Yakubboev (m) /  Mishra Anwesha (f)
 U16 winners:  Arash Tahbaz (m) /  Mobina Alinasab (f)
 U18 winners:  Mersad Khodashenas (m) /  Nguyễn Thanh Thủy Tiên (f)
 April 9: Asian Youth Blitz Championship 2016 in  Ulaanbaatar
 U6 winners:  Chin-Erdem Batbaatar (m) /  Pagamdulam Munkhdemberel (f)
 U8 winners:  Dang Anh Minh (m) /  Vu My Linh (f)
 U10 winners:  Yesuntumur Tugstumur (m) /  Nguyễn Hồng Nhung (f)
 U12 winners:  R. Praggnanandhaa (m) /  Divya Deshmukh (f)
 U14 winners:  Nodirbek Yakubboev (m) /  Turmunkh Munkhzul (f)
 U16 winners:  Ortik Nigmatov (m) /  R. Vaishali (f)
 U18 winners:  Arystanbek Urazayev (m) /  V. Varshini (f)
 April 10: Asian Youth Rapid Championship 2016 in  Ulaanbaatar
 U6 winners:  Amarbat Baatar (m) /  Gantsolmon Enkh-Uyanga (f)
 U8 winner:  Artin Ashraf (m) /  Vu My Linh (f)
 U10 winners:  Yesuntumur Tugstumur (m) /  Davaakhuu Munkhzul (f)
 U12 winners:  Duc Tri Ngo (m) /  Nazerke Nurgali (f)
 U14 winners:  Yondonjamts Erdemdalai (m) /  Turmunkh Munkhzul (f)
 U16 winners:  Byambasuren Garidmagnai (m) /  R. Vaishali (f)
 U18 winners:  Erdenepurev Boldoo (m) /  Uurtsaikh Uuriintuya (f)
 May 2 – 11: Asian Juniors and Girls U-20 Championships 2016 in  New Delhi
 Winners:  Aravindh Chithambaram (m) /  Uurtsaikh Uuriintuya (f)
 May 3: Asian Juniors and Girls Rapid Championship 2016 in  New Delhi
 Winners:  Masoud Mosadeghpour (m) /  R. Vaishali (f)
 May 11: Asian Juniors and Girls Blitz Championship 2016 in  New Delhi
 Winners:  Narayanan Sunilduth Lyna /  R. Vaishali (f)
 May 25 – June 5: Asian Individual Championship (Men and Women) 2016 in  Tashkent
 Winners:  S. P. Sethuraman (m) /  Bhakti Kulkarni
 June 4: Asian Individual Blitz Championship (Men and Women) 2016 in  Tashkent
 Winners:  Lu Shanglei (m) /  Nguyễn Thị Mai Hưng
 May 29 – June 8: 17th ASEAN+ Age Group Open Chess Championships 2016 in  Pattaya
  won both the gold and overall medal tallies
 July 9 – 18: Asian Schools Chess Championships 2016 in  Tehran
 U7 winners:  Alikhon Avazkhonov (m) /  Afruza Khamdamova (f)
 U9 winners:  Yousefi Kafshgarkola Seyed Roh (m) /  Daren Dela Cruz (f)
 U11 winners:  Seyed Kian Poormosavi (m) /  Parnian Ghomi (f)
 U13 winners:  Azat Nurmamedov (m) /  Motahare Asadi (f)
 U15 winners:  Stephen Rome Pangilinan (m) /  Sedigheh Kalantari (f)
 U17 winners:  Arash Tahbaz (m) /  Doroy Allaney Jia G (f)
 July 10: Asian Schools Rapid Championships 2016 in  Tehran
 U7 winners:  Khumoyun Sindarov (m) /  Afruza Khamdamova (f)
 U9 winners:  Roshan S (m) /  Erdenebat Enkhjin (f)
 U11 winners:  Bardiya Daneshvar (m) /  Zahra Heydari (f)
 U13 winners:  Mahan Saberi (m) /  Nikta Nadernia (f)
 U15 winners:  Soltan Myradow (m) /  Kylen Joy Mordido (f)
 U17 winners:  Mohammadamin Molaei (m) /  Mitra Asgharzadeh (f)
 July 17: Asian Schools Blitz Championships 2016 in  Tehran
 U7 winners:  Sunle Gong (m) /  Afruza Khamdamova (f)
 U9 winners:  Jagadeesh Siddharth (m) /  Ehsha Mishela Pallie (f)
 U11 winners:  Bardiya Daneshvar (m) /  Lala Shohradowa (f)
 U13 winners:  Daniel Quizon (m) /  Saba Jalali (f)
 U15 winners:  Daler Vakhidov (m) /  Sedigheh Kalantari (f)
 U17 winners:  Mohammadamin Molaei (m) /  Doroy Allaney Jia G (f)
 August 5 – 10: East Asian Youth Chess Championship in  Gangwon Province
 U8 mixed winner:  Enkh-Amgalan Amgalantengis
 U10 winners:  Richard Meng (m) /  Munkhtur Tergel (f)
 U12 mixed winner:  Ganzorig Amartuvshin
 U14 mixed winner:  Ochirkhuyag Ulziikhishigjargal
 U16 mixed winner:  Nguyễn Đặng Hồng Phúc
 U20 mixed winner:  Muhammad Lutfi Ali
 September 1 – 6: South Asian Amateur Championship 2016 in  Srinagar
 Winner:  V Raghav Srivathsav
 October 26 – November 5: Asian Seniors Chess Championship 2016 in  Mandalay
 50+ years winner:  Han Myint
 65+ years winner:  Wazeer Ahmad Khan
 November 16 – 25: Asian Amateur Chess Championship 2016 in  Kuwait City

African events
 March 28 – April 6: African Zonal 4.4 in  Accra (men only)
 Winner:  Oladapo Adu
 April 22 – May 1: African Zonal 4.2 in  Dar-es-Salaam
 Winners:  Adham Kandil (m) /  Shrook Wafa (f)
 April 23 – May 2: African Zonal 4.3 in  Le Morne
 Winners:  Ryan Pierre Van Rensburg (m) /  Jesse Nikki February (f)
 May 23 – 31: African Zonal 4.1 in  Taroudant
 Winners:  Adlane Arab /  Rania Sbai (f)
 July 16 – 27: African Individual Championships in  Kampala
 Winners:  Abdelrahman Hesham (m) /  Shrook Wafa (f)
 July 25: African Blitz Championships in  Kampala
 Winners:  Ahmed Adly (m) /  Shrook Wafa (f)
 July 26: African Rapid Championships  Kampala
 Winners:  Samy Shoker (m) /  Shahenda Wafa (f)
 August 11 – 18: African Amateur Individual Championships in  Lomé
 Under 2000 Open winner:  Philip Elikem Ameku
 Under 2300 Open winner:  Anass Ouazri
 August 21 – 29: African Youth Championships in  Port Elizabeth
 U8 winners:  Ahmed Kandil (m) /  Yanti Nunnan (f)
 U10 winners:  Safin Benyahia (m) /  Aarti Datharam (f)
 U12 winners:  Wassel Bousmaha (m) /  Nicola Putter (f)
 U14 winners:  Samy Leffad (m) /  Lina Nassr (f)
 U16 winners:  Keegan Agulhas (m) /  Rania Nassr (f)
 U18 winners:  Ahmad Nassr (m) /  Inge Marx (f)
 December 10 – 18: African Schools Individual Championships in  Lusaka
 December 27 – January 6, 2017: African Junior Championships in  Tunis

Arab events
 February 1 – 9: 8th Arab Women Clubs Championship 2016 in  Kuwait City
 Overall winner club:  Golden Team club
 October 1 – 10: Arab Individual Chess Championship 2016 (Women & Open) in 
 Winners:  Mahfoud Oussedik (m) /  Sabrina Latreche (f)
 October 4: Arab Individual Blitz Championship 2016 (Women & Open) in 
 Winners:  Husein Aziz Nezad (m) /  Sabrina Latreche (f)
 October 5 – 6: Arab Individual Rapid Championship 2016 (Women & Open) in 
 Winners:  Husein Aziz Nezad (m) /  Alshaeby Boshra (f)

Cricket
 January 22 – February 14: 2016 Under-19 Cricket World Cup in  Dhaka
 The  defeated  by 5 wickets in the final, to win their first Under-19 Cricket World Cup title.  took third place.
 March 8 – April 3: 2016 ICC World Twenty20 in 
 Men: The  defeated  by 4 wickets to win their second ICC World Twenty20 title. 
 Women: The  defeated  by 8 wickets to win their first ICC Women's World Twenty20 title.
 June 29 – August 7: 2016 Caribbean Premier League
 The  Jamaica Tallawahs defeated the  Guyana Amazon Warriors, by nine wickets, to win their second Caribbean Premier League title.

Cross-country skiing

Curling

Cyclo-cross bike racing

Darts

Draughts
World Draughts Federation International

International
 February 14 – 18: 2016 Qatar World Championship Turkish Draughts in  Doha
 Winner:  Faik Yıldız
 February 25 – March 3: IMSA Elite Mind Games in  Huai'an
 Rapid winners:  Alexander Georgiev (m) /  Matrena Nogovitsyna (f)
 Blitz winners:  Alexei Chizhov (m) /  Darya Tkachenko (f)
 Super blitz winners:  Alexander Schwarzman (m) /  Tamara Tansykkuzhina (f)
 April 29 – May 1: World Championship blitz & rapid in  Izmir
 Rapid winners:  Yuri Anikeev (m) /  Matrena Nogovitsyna (f)
 Blitz winners:  Murodoullo Amrillaev (m) /  Aygul Idrisova
 May 2: 1st Women's World Championship Turkish Draughts in  Izmir
 Winner:  Darya Tkachenko
 June 9 – 12: Women's World Championship English Draughts (Checkers) in  Rome
 Winner:  Amangul Berdieva
 July 8 – 15: World Title Match English Draughts (Checkers) Sergio Scarpetta-Michele Borghetti in  Rome
 Winner:  Michele Borghetti
 July 20 – 30: Asian Championship 2016 in  Ulaanbaatar
 64 Standard Open winners:  Liu Jinxin (m) /  Liu Pei (f)
 Blitz Open winners:  Alisher Artikov (m) /  Liu Pei (f)
 100 Standard Open winners:  Manlai Ravjir (m) /  Nyamjargal Munkhbaatar (f)
 100 Rapid Open winners:  ZHOU Wei (m) /  You Zhang (f)
 100 Blitz Open winners:  Ganjargal Ganbaatar (m) /  Sai Ya (f)
 Turkish Open winners:  Chengcheng Tian (m) /  Batdelger Nandintsetseg (f)
 July 31 – August 9: European Youth Championship 2016 in  Pinsk
Main
 U10 winners:  Marsel Sharafutdinov (m) /  Rufina Tavlykaeva
 U13 winners:  Nikita Volkov (m) /  Olga Balukova
 U16 winners:  Marsel Sharafutdinov (m) /  Ksenia Nakhova
 U19 winners:  Martijn van IJzendoorn (m) /  Ayanika Kychkina
 U26 winners:  Andrei Tolchykau (m) /  Darja Fedorovich
Blitz
 U10 winners:  Savva Zaika (m) /  Nastassia Sakalova
 U13 winners:  Nikita Volkov (m) /  Aygiza Muhametyanova
 U16 winners:  Michael Semyaniuk (m) /  Elena Cesnokova
 U19 winners:  Martijn van IJzendoorn (m) /  Katarzyna Stańczuk
 U26 winners:  Andrei Tolchykau (m) /  Aygul Idrisova
 Rapid here not played September 1 – 19: Women's World Title Match Sadowska – Kamychleeva in  Karpacz
 Winner:  Natalia Sadowska
 September 14 – 29: 2016 African Championship in  Bamako
 Main winner:  N'Diaga Samb
 Blitz winner:  Jean Marc Ndjofang
 September 18 – 27: 2016 European Veteran Championship in  Korbach
 Men's winner:  Evgeni Gurkov
 Women's winner:  Romualda Shidlauskiene
 September 20 – 30: Pan American Championship in  Águas de Lindóia
 Winner:  Allan Igor Moreno Silva
 September 22 – 29: XIII World Championship (Brazilian 64) in  Águas de Lindóia
 Winner:  Alexander Georgiev
 October 2 – 6: 2016 European Team Championship in  Tallinn
 Men's winners:  (Jan Groenendijk, Roel Boomstra, Alexander Baliakin)
 Women's winners: 
 October 18 – 24: 2016 European Championship in  Izmir
 Winners:  Alexei Chizhov (m) /  Aygul Idrisova (f)
 October 25: 2016 European Rapid Championship in  Izmir
 Winners:  Alexander Schwarzman (m) /  Tamara Tansykkuzhina (f)
 October 26: 2016 European Blitz Championship in  Izmir
 Winners:  Ainur Shaibakov (m) /  Matrena Nogovitsyna (f)
 October 27: 2016 European Super-Blitz Cup in  Izmir
 Winners:  Alexei Chizhov (m) /  Matrena Nogovitsyna (f)

Major
 February 22 – 28: 2016 Cannes Open World Cup in  Cannes
 Winners:  Christian Niami (m) /  Romualda Šidlauskienė
 March 19 – 27: Roethof Open World Cup in  Paramaribo
 Winners:  Alexander Schwarzman (m) /  Natalia Sadowska (f)
 May 15 – 23: Salou Open World Cup in  Salou
 Winners:  Alexander Georgiev (m) /  Natalia Sadowska (f)
 September 4 – 10: Polish Open World Cup in  Karpacz
 Winner:  Aleksandr Getmanski

Open
 February 5 – 7: 2016 Riga Open in  Riga
 Winner:  Edvardas Bužinskis
 March 24 – 28: 2016 Open Guadeloupe in  Baie-Mahault
 Winner:  Alexander Mogilianski
 May 6 – 15: 12th Thailand Open in  Pattaya
 Winner:  Ivan Trofimov
 July 24 – 30: 2016 Nijmegen Open in  Nijmegen
 Winner:  Roel Boomstra
 August 5 – 13: 2016 Brunssum Open in  Brunssum
 Winner:  Erno Prosman
 August 15 – 20: 2016 MTB Open in  Hoogeveen
 Winner:  Martijn van IJzendoorn
 September 28 – October 5: 2016 Sunny Beach Open in  Sunny Beach
 November 18 – 24: 4th "XingQiu Cup" International Open in  Lishui

Equestrianism

Fencing

Field hockey
 January 15 – December 11: 2016 FIH Calendar of Events

2016 Summer Olympics (FIH)
 August 6 – 19: 2016 Summer Olympics in  Rio de Janeiro at the Olympic Hockey Centre
 Men:  ;  ;  
 Women:  ;  ;  

International field hockey events
 June 10 – 17: 2016 Men's Hockey Champions Trophy in  London
 Note: This event was slated for San Miguel de Tucumán, but the contract was cancelled.  defeated , 3–1 in penalties and after a 0–0 score in regular play, to win their 13th Men's Hockey Champions Trophy title.
  took third place.
 June 18 – 26: 2016 Women's Hockey Champions Trophy in  London
 The  took third place.
 November 23 – December 4: 2016 Women's Hockey Junior World Cup in  Santiago
  took third place.
 December 8 – 18: 2016 Men's Hockey Junior World Cup in  New Delhi
  defeated , 2–1, to win their second Men's Hockey Junior World Cup title.
  took third place.

European Hockey Federation (EHF)
 January 15 – 17: 2016 Men's EuroHockey Indoor Championship in  Prague
  defeated , 3–2, in the final.  took third place.
 January 22 – 24: 2016 Women's EuroHockey Indoor Championship in  Minsk
 The  defeated , 6–2, in the final.  took third place.
 February 12 – 14: 2016 Men's EuroHockey Indoor Club Champions Cup in  Hamburg
  Harvestehuder THC defeated  SV Arminen, 2–1, in the final.  Partille Sport Club took third place.
 February 12 – 14: 2016 Men's EuroHockey Indoor Club Champions Trophy in  Pavlovski Posad
 Winner:  AH&BC Amsterdam
 Second:  Dinamo Elektrostal
 Third:  Inverleith HC
 February 19 – 21: 2016 Women's EuroHockey Indoor Club Champions Trophy in  Dundee
 Winner:  HC Rotweiss Wettingen
 Second:  Royal Pingouin HC
 Third:  Bowdon Hightown
 February 19 – 21: 2016 Women's EuroHockdey Indoor Club Champions Cup in  Minsk
  Düsseldorfer HC defeated  Club de Campo Villa de Madrid, 2–0, in the final.  SK Slavia Prague took third place.
 May 13 – 16: 2016 EuroHockey Men's Club Champions Trophy in  Glasgow
  Cardiff & Met defeated  Banbridge Hockey Club, 4–0, in the final.  Bromac Kelburne took third place.
 May 13 – 16: 2016 EuroHockey Women's Club Champions Cup in  Bilthoven
  HC 's-Hertogenbosch defeated fellow Dutch team, SCHC, 3–2 in penalty shoot-outs and after a 1–1 score in regular play, in the final.  UHC Hamburg took third place.
 May 13 – 16: 2016 EuroHockey Women's Club Champions Trophy in  Barcelona
  Rot-Weiss Köln defeated  Royal Antwerp HC, 4–2, in the final.  HC Minsk took third place.
 May 14 & 15: 2016 EHL Final Four in  Barcelona
  SV Kampong defeated fellow Dutch team, AH&BC Amsterdam, 2–0 in the final.  Harvestehuder THC took third place.
 July 24 – 30: 2016 EuroHockey Boys' and Girls' U18 Championships in  Cork
 Girls: The  defeated , 2–0, in the final.  took third place.

Pan American Hockey Federation (PAHF)
 March 29 – April 10: 2016 Pan American Junior Championship for Women in  Tacarigua
  took the bronze medal.
 May 20 – 28: 2016 Pan American Junior Championship for Men in  Toronto
  defeated , 5–0, to win their 11th consecutive Pan American Men's Field Hockey Junior Championship title. 
  took the bronze medal.
 October 1 – 9: 2016 South American Championships for Men and Women in  Chiclayo
 Men: 1. ; 2. ; 3. 
 Women: 1. ; 2. ; 3. 

Asian Hockey Federation (AHF)
 September 24 – 30: 2016 Boys' U18 Asia Cup in  Dhaka
  defeated , 5–4, in the final.
 October 1 – 9: 2016 Women's AHF Cup in  Bangkok
  defeated , 4–0, in the final.
 October 20 – 30: 2016 Asian Men's Hockey Champions Trophy in  Kuantan District
  defeated , 3–2, to win their second Asian Men's Hockey Champions Trophy title.  took third place.
 October 29 – November 6: 2016 Asian Women's Hockey Champions Trophy in 
  defeated , 2–1, to win their first Asian Women's Hockey Champions Trophy title.  took third place.
 November 19 – 27: 2016 Men's AHF Cup in 
  defeated , 3–0, in the final.  took third place.
 December 15 – 22: 2016 Girl's U18 Asia Cup in  Bangkok
  defeated , 4–2, in the final.  took third place.

African Hockey Federation (AfHF)
 March 18 – 28: 2016 Junior African Cup for Men and Women in  Windhoek
 Men:  defeated , 3–2, in the final.  took the bronze medal.
 Women's winner: 
 Women's runner-up: 

Figure skating

Fistball
 January 16 & 17: IFA 2016 Fistball Men's European Champions' Cup Indoor in  Diepoldsau
  TSV Dennach defeated  Union Arnreit 4–1, in the final.  Ahlhorner SV took third place.
 January 16 & 17: IFA 2016 Fistball Women's European Champions' Cup Indoor in  Rohrbach
  TSV Pfungstadt defeated  TuS Kremsmünster 4–0, in the final.  TV Schweinfurt-Oberndorf took third place.
 July 1 – 2: EFA 2016 Fistball Men's European Cup in  Unterweitersdorf
  STV Wigoltingen defeated  VFK Berlin, 3–2.  MTV Rosenheim took third place.
 July 1 – 2: Men's Champions Cup 2016 in  Pfungstadt
  TSV Pfungstadt defeated  Union Compact Freistadt 4–0, in the final.  TV SW-Oberndorf took third place.
 July 2 & 3: EFA 2016 Fistball Women's European Champions' Cup in  Jona
  TSV Dennach defeated  TSV Jona, 3–2.  SV Moslesfehn took third place.
 July 9 & 10: EFA 2016 Fistball U21 Men's European Championship in 
 Round-robin: 1. , 2. , 3. , 4. 
 July 20 – 24: IFA 2016 Fistball U18 Men's and Women's World Championships in  Nürnberg
 Men's:  defeated , 4–2.
  took third place.
 Women's:  defeated , 4–2
  took third place.
 August 5 – 7: IFA 2016 Fistball Women's World Cup in  Neuenbürg
  Duque de Caixas defeated  TSV Dennach, 4–1.
 August 26 – 28: 2016 Fistball European Championships in  Grieskirchen
 In the final,  defeated , 4–2.  took third place.
 October 14 – 16: IFA 2016 Fistball Men's World Cup in  Cape Town
 Winner:  TSV Pfungstadt, 2nd:  Club Mercês, 3rd:  South Melbourne Fistball Club, 4th:  Archbishops of Banterbury
 October 23 – 30: IFA 2016 Fistball Women's World Championship in  Pomerode
  defeated  4:2 (08:11, 11:04, 14:15, 11:09, 11:05, 11:06) to win their fifth Fistball Women's World Championship.
  took third place.
 November 4 – 6: U16 South American Fistball Championship in  Novo Hamburgo
 Men's: 1. , 2. , 3. 
 Women's: 1. , 2. , 3. 
 November 19 & 20: IFA South America Fistball Cup 2016 in  Santiago
 Men's: 1.  Sogipa Porto Alegre, 2.  Merces Curitiba, 3.  Ginástica Novo Hamburgo
 Women's: 1.  Duque de Caxias Curitiba, 2.  Sogipa Porto Alegre, 3.  Club Manquehue Santiago

Floorball

Open
 August 11 – 14: Czech Open (clubs) in  Prague
 Men:  EraViikingit defeated  Hollvikens, 2–0.
 Top scorer: Mika Moilanen (EräViikingit)
 Best goalie: Robin Johansson (Höllviken IBF)
 Best player: Miko Kailiala (EräViikingit)
 Women:  Pixbo Wallenstam IBK defeated  1. SC TEMPISH Vítkovice 4–3.
 Top scorer: Martina Řepková (Florbal Chodov)
 Best goalkeeper: Lenka Kubíčková (1. SC TEMPISH Vítkovice) 
 Best player: Stephanie Boberg (Pixbo Wallenstam IBK)
 September 9 – 11: Polish Open (national teams) in  Wrocław
 In the final,  defeated , 3–4.  took third place.
 Best scorer:  Rasmus Kainulainen
 Best Goalkeeper:  Daniel Muck

Europe
 August 24 – 28: EuroFloorball Challenge in  Budapest and Érd
 Men's:  Phoenix Fireball SE defeated  Dunai Krokodilok SE, 7–4.  FBC Bozen.
 Women's:  CDE El Valle defeated  Neumann Pillangók, 4–1.  Phoenix Fireball SE took third place.
 September 30 – October 2: Champions Cup in  Borås
 Men's:  Storvreta IBK defeated  SC Classic, 2–1.
 Women's:  Pixbo Wallenstam IBK defeated  SC Classic, 6–2.
 October 5 – 9: EuroFloorball Cup in  Weißenfels
 Men's:  UHC Weißenfels defeated  SK Lielvarde 8–6.
 Women's:  Sveiva IB defeated  UHC Weißenfels 5–0.

International Championships
 May 4 – 8: 2016 Women's under-19 World Floorball Championships in  Belleville
  defeated , 6–3, to win their fifth Women's under-19 World Floorball Championships.  took third place.
 July 19 – 24: World University Championships in  Porto
 Men:  defeated , 5–4, in extra time.  took third place.
 Women:  defeated , 3–2 after penalties, after 2–2 in regular game.  took third place.
 December 3 – 11: 2016 Men's World Floorball Championships in  Riga
  defeated , 4–2 after penalties, after 3–3 in regular game.  took third place.

Freestyle skiing

Futsal
 February 2 – 13: UEFA Futsal Euro 2016 in 
  defeated , 7–3, to win their seventh UEFA Futsal Euro title.  took third place. 
 February 10 – 21: 2016 AFC Futsal Championship in 
  defeated , 2–1, to win their eleventh AFC Futsal Championship title.  took third place.
 April 15 – 24: 2016 Africa Futsal Cup of Nations in 
  defeated , 3–2, to win their first Africa Futsal Cup of Nations title.  took third place.
 May 8 – 14: 2016 CONCACAF Futsal Championship in 
  defeated , 4–0, to win their second consecutive and third overall CONCACAF Futsal Championship title.  took third place.
 May 21 – 28: 2016 South American Under-17 Futsal Championship in  Foz do Iguaçu
  defeated , 4–2, to win their first South American Under-17 Futsal Championship.  took third place.
 June 12 – 19: Copa Libertadores de Futsal 2016 in  Asunción
 In the final,  Cerro Porteño defeated  Jaraguá, 4–2, tp win their first Copa Libertadores Cup.  Rionegro Futsal took third place. 
 July 2 – 10: 2016 FISU World University Futsal Championship in  Goiânia
 Men:  defeated , 2–1, in the final. The  took third place.
 Women:  defeated , 1–0, in the final.  took third place.
 July 10 – 16: 2016 AFF Futsal Club Championship in  Naypyidaw
 Men:  Port Futsal Club defeated  Thai Son Nam, 4–3, to win their second consecutive AFF Futsal Club Championship title. 
  Myanmar Imperial College took third place.
 Women:  Jaya Kencana Angels defeated  Khon Kaen Futsal Team, 5–4 on penalties and after a 2–2 score in regular play, to win their first Women's AFF Futsal Club Championship title. 
  Thai Son Nam District 8 took third place.
 July 15 – 22: 2016 CONMEBOL Women's U20 Futsal Championships in  Asunción (debut event)
  defeated , 4–2, to win the inaugural CONMEBOL Women's U20 Futsal Championships title. 
  took third place.
 July 15 – 23: 2016 AFC Futsal Club Championship in  Bangkok
  Nagoya Oceans defeated  Naft Al-Wasat SC, 6–5 in penalties and after a 4–4 score in regular play, to win their third AFC Futsal Club Championship title.
  Chonburi Blue Wave took third place.
 September 10 – October 1: 2016 FIFA Futsal World Cup in 
  defeated , 5–4, to win their first FIFA Futsal World Cup title.
  took third place.
 October 31 – November 8: 2016 AFF Futsal Championship in  Bangkok
 Event cancelled.
 December 11 – 18: 2016 South American Under-20 Futsal Championship in 
  defeated , 2–1, to win their first South American Under-20 Futsal Championship title.
  took third place.

Golf

2016 Summer Olympics
 August 11 – 14: 2016 Summer Olympics (Men) in Rio de Janeiro
   Justin Rose;   Henrik Stenson;   Matt Kuchar
 August 17 – 20: 2016 Summer Olympics (Women) in Rio de Janeiro
   Inbee Park;   Lydia Ko;   Shanshan Feng

2016 Men's major golf championships
 April 7 – 10: 2016 Masters Tournament
 Winner:  Danny Willett (first major win; first PGA Tour win)
 June 16 – 19: 2016 U.S. Open
 Winner:  Dustin Johnson (first major win; 10th PGA Tour win)
 July 14 – 17: 2016 Open Championship
 Winner:  Henrik Stenson (first major win)
 July 28 – 31: 2016 PGA Championship
 Winner:  Jimmy Walker (first major win; 6th PGA Tour win)

2016 World Golf Championships (WGC)
 March 3–6: 2016 WGC-Cadillac Championship
 Winner:  Adam Scott (second WGC win, first WGC-Cadillac win)
 March 23–27: 2016 WGC-Dell Match Play
 Winner:  Jason Day (second WGC-Match Play win)
 June 30 – July 3: 2016 WGC-Bridgestone Invitational
 Winner:  Dustin Johnson (first WGC-Bridgestone Invitational win, third WGC win; 11th PGA Tour win)
 October 27–30: 2016 WGC-HSBC Champions
 Winner:  Hideki Matsuyama (first WGC win, third PGA Tour win)

Other men's golf events
 May 12 – 15: 2016 Players Championship 
 Winner:  Jason Day (first Players win, tenth PGA Tour win)
 May 26 – 29: 2016 BMW PGA Championship (European Tour)
 Winner:  Chris Wood (first BMW PGA Championship win, third European Tour win)
 September 30 – October 2: 2016 Ryder Cup at Hazeltine National Golf Club in Chaska, Minnesota
 Winner:  (First victory since 2008)
 November 24 – 27: 2016 World Cup of Golf at Kingston Heath Golf Club in Melbourne, Australia
 Winner:  Denmark (first World Cup victory)

2016 Senior major golf championships
 May 19 – 22: Regions Tradition
 Winner:  Bernhard Langer (first Regions Tradition title; sixth Senior major golf championship win)
 May 26 – 29: Senior PGA Championship
 Winner:  Rocco Mediate (first Senior PGA Championship and Senior Major win)
 June 9 – 12: Constellation Senior Players Championship
 Winner:  Bernhard Langer (third straight Senior Players Championship title; seventh Senior major golf championship win)
 July 21 – 24: Senior Open Championship
 Winner:  Paul Broadhurst (first Senior Open Championship and Senior Major win)
 August 11 – 15: U.S. Senior Open
 Winner:  Gene Sauers (first US Senior Open and Senior Major win)

2016 Women's major golf championships
 March 31 – April 3: 2016 ANA Inspiration
 Winner:  Lydia Ko (second consecutive major win, first ANA Inspiration win; second consecutive LPGA Tour win)
 June 9 – 12: 2016 KPMG Women's PGA Championship
 Winner:  Brooke Henderson (first Major win, second LPGA Tour win)
 July 7 – 10: 2016 U.S. Women's Open
 Winner:  Brittany Lang (first Major win, second LPGA Tour win)
 July 28 – 31: 2016 Women's British Open
 Winner:  Ariya Jutanugarn (first Major win, fourth LPGA Tour win)
 September 15 – 18: 2016 Evian Championship
 Winner:  Chun In-gee (first Evian Championship win, second Major win, second LPGA Tour win)

2016 International Crown
 July 21 – 24: 2016 International Crown at the Merit Club in Libertyville, Illinois (Chicago metropolitan area)
 Winners: The  (13 points)

FISU
 June 22 – 26: 2016 World University Golf Championship in  Brive-la-Gaillarde
 Men's Individual: 1  Robin Dawson, 2.  Xuewem Luo, 3.  Yu-Chen Yeh
 Women's Individual: 1.  Karolina Vlckova, 2.  Marie Luňáčková, 3.  Kateřina Vlašínová
 Men's Team: 1. , 2. , 3. 
 Women's Team: 1. , 2. , 3. 

Grass skiing

 July 23 – 29: 2016 FIS Grass Ski Junior World Championships in  Dizin
 Super Combined winners:  Martin Barták (m) /  Kristin Hetfleisch (f)
 Super G #1 winners:  Martin Barták (m) /  Kristin Hetfleisch (f)
 Super G #2 winners:  Martin Barták (m) /  Marino Maeda (f)
 Slalom winners:  Martin Barták (m) /  Magdaléna Kotyzová (f)
 Giant Slalom winners:  Marcel Knapp (m) /  Daniela Krueckel (f)

2016 FIS Grass Ski World Cup
 June 4 & 5: WC #1 in  Rettenbach
 Men's Giant Slalom winner:  Edoardo Frau
 Women's Giant Slalom winner:  Jacqueline Gerlach
 Men's Super Combined winner:  Mirko Hüppi
 Women's Super Combined winner:  Jacqueline Gerlach
 July 2 & 3: WC #2 in  Předklášteří
 Men's Slalom winner:  Jan Gardavsky
 Women's Slalom winner:  Jacqueline Gerlach
 Men's Giant Slalom winner:  Michael Stocker
 July 8 – 10: WC #3 in  Kaprun
 Men's Super G winner:  Mirko Hüppi
 Women's Super G winner:  Barbara Míková
 Men's Super Combined winner:  Edoardo Frau
 Women's Super Combined winner:  Jacqueline Gerlach
 Men's Giant Slalom winner:  Edoardo Frau
 Women's Giant Slalon winner:  Kristin Hetfleisch
 August 20 & 21: WC #7 in  Santa Caterina Ski Area
 Men's Slalom #1 winner:  Michael Stocker
 Men's Slalom #2 winner:  Michael Stocker
 Women's Slalom #1 winner:  Jacqueline Gerlach
 Women's Slalom #2 winner:  Daniela Krückel
 August 27 & 28: WC #5 in  Marbach
 Men's Giant Slalom winner:  Edoardo Frau
 Women's Giant Slalom winner:  Jacqueline Gerlach
 Men's Super G winner:  Edoardo Frau
 Women's Super G winner:  Barbara Míková
 September 1 – 4: WC #6 (final) in  Ravascletto
 Men's Giant Slalom winner:  Marc Zickbauer
 Women's Giant Slalom winner:  Barbara Míková
 Men's Super G winner:  Michael Stocker
 Women's Super G winner:  Barbara Míková
 Men's Super Combined winner:  Marc Zickbauer
 Women's Super Combined winner:  Barbara Míková
 Men's Slalom winner:  Jan Gardavský
 Women's Slalom winner:  Daniela Krueckel

Gymnastics

Handball
 January 6 – December 18: 2016 IHF Calendar of Events

2016 Summer Olympics (IHF)
 August 6 – 21: 2016 Summer Olympics in  Rio de Janeiro at the Olympic Training Center
 Men:  ;  ;  
 Women:  ;  ;  

EHF
 September 5, 2015 – May 29, 2016: 2015–16 EHF Champions League
  Vive Targi Kielce defeated  MVM Veszprém KC, 39–38, after overtime and penalties, to win their first EHF Champions League title. 
  Paris Saint-Germain took third place.
 September 5, 2015 – May 15, 2016: 2015–16 EHF Cup
  Frisch Auf Göppingen defeated  HBC Nantes, 32–26, to win their first EHF Cup title.  BM Granollers took third place.
 October 11, 2015 – May 21, 2016: 2015–16 EHF Challenge Cup
  ABC Braga defeated  S.L. Benfica, 53–51, to win their first EHF Challenge Cup title.
 September 12, 2015 – May 7, 2016: 2015–16 Women's EHF Champions League
  CSM Bucharest defeated  Győri ETO, 29–26, to win their first Women's EHF Champions League title.  ŽRK Vardar took third place.
 October 16, 2015 – May 6, 2016: 2015–16 Women's EHF Cup
  Dunaújvárosi Kohász KA defeated  TuS Metzingen, 55–49, to win their second Women's EHF Cup title. 
 October 17, 2015 – May 7, 2016: 2015–16 Women's EHF Cup Winners' Cup
  Team Tvis Holstebro defeated  Handball Club Lada, 61–52, to win their first Women's EHF Cup Winners' Cup title.
 November 14, 2015 – May 7, 2016: 2015–16 Women's EHF Challenge Cup
  Gran Canaria defeated  Kastamonu Bld. GSK, 62–54, to win their first Women's EHF Challenge Cup title.
 January 15 – 31: 2016 European Men's Handball Championship in 
  defeated , 24–17, to win their second European Men's Handball Championship title.  took the bronze medal.
 July 4 – 8: 2016 European Open Handball Championship for Women in  Gothenburg
  defeated , 34–33, to win their first European Open Handball Championship title.  took third place.
 July 8 – 10: 2016 European Youth Beach Handball Championship in  Nazaré
 Men:  defeated , 2–1 in matches played, in the final.  took third place.
 Women: The  defeated , 2–0 in matches played, in the final.  took third place.
 July 28 – August 7: 2016 European Men's Junior Handball Championship in  Kolding
  defeated , 30–29, to win their second European Men's Junior Handball Championship title. 
  took third place.
 December 4 – 18: 2016 European Women's Handball Championship in 
  took third place.

CAHB
 January 21 – 30: 2016 African Men's Handball Championship in 
  defeated , 21–19, to win their sixth African Men's Handball Championship title.  took the bronze medal.
 May 4 – 14: 2016 African Women's Handball Cup Winners' Cup in  Laayoune
  Primeiro de Agosto defeated  TKC Yaoundé, 40–16, to win their second Women's African Handball Cup Winners' Cup.  Progresso took third place.
 May 4 – 14: 2016 African Handball Cup Winners' Cup in  Laayoune
  Zamalek SC defeated  Espérance Tunis, 26–25, to win their fifth African Handball Cup Winners' Cup.  AS Hammamet took third place.
 May 4: 2016 African Handball Super Cup for men's and women's in  Laayoune
 Men:  Espérance Tunis defeated  Zamalek SC, 33–32, after overtime, to win their second African Handball Super Cup.
 Women:  Primeiro de Agosto defeated  Africa Sports, 33–14, to win their second African Handball Super Cup.
 September 2 – 9: 2016 African Men's Youth Handball Championship in  Bamako
  defeated , 26–25, to win their first African Men's Youth Handball Championship title.
  took the bronze medal. 
 September 11 – 18: 2016 African Men's Junior Handball Championship in  Bamako
  defeated , 26–25, to win their fourth African Men's Junior Handball Championship title.
  took the bronze medal.

AHF
 January 15 – 28: 2016 Asian Men's Handball Championship in 
  defeated , 27–22, to win their second consecutive Asian Men's Handball Championship title.  took the bronze medal.
 March 18 – 24: 18th Asian Club League 2016 in  Doha
 1.  Lekhwiya; 2.  Al-Najma; 3.  Al-Noor
 July 22 – August 1: 2016 Asian Men's Junior Handball Championship in  Amman
  defeated , 23–16, to win their fifth title and fourth consecutive Asian Men's Junior Handball Championship. 
  took third place.
 August 10 – 17: 2016 Asian Men's & Women's Youth Beach Handball Championship in  Pattaya (debut event)
 Men: 1. ; 2. ; 3. 
 Women: 1. ; 2. ; 3. 
 August 27 – September 5: 2016 Asian Men's Youth Handball Championship in  Manama
  defeated , 25–23, to win their first Asian Men's Youth Handball Championship title. 
  took third place.
 October 26 – November 1: 2016 Asian Women's Club League Handball Championship in  Kyzylorda (debut event)
 1.  Kaysar; 2.  Almaty Club; 3.  Ile Club
 October 29 – November 5: 2016 Asian Men's Club League Handball Championship in  Amman
  Al-Noor defeated  El Jaish SC, 25–23, to win their first Asian Men's Club League Handball Championship title.
  Lekhwiya Handball Team took third place.

PATHF
 March 15 – 19: 2016 Pan American Women's Junior Handball Championship in  Foz do Iguaçu
 1. ; 2. ; 3. 
 April 12 – 16: 2016 Pan American Women's Youth Handball Championship in  Santiago
 1. ; 2. ; 3. 
 May 25 – 29: 2016 Pan American Men's Club Handball Championship in  Buenos Aires
  Handebol Taubaté defeated fellow Brazilian team, Esporte Pinheiros, 28–23, to win their fourth consecutive Pan American Men's Club Handball Championship title. 
  SAG Villa Ballester took third place.
 June 11 – 19: 2016 Pan American Men's Handball Championship in  Buenos Aires
  defeated , 28–24, to win their third Pan American Men's Handball Championship title.  took third place.
 November 1 – 5: 2016 Pan American Women's Club Handball Championship in  Santiago
  Metodista São Bernardo defeated  Ferro Carril Oeste, 29–15, to win the first ever Pan American Women's Club Handball Championship. 
  Club Atlético Goes took third place.

International handball championships
 March 18 – 20: 2016 Women's Handball Olympic Qualifying event #1 in  Astrakhan
  and  both qualified to compete at Rio 2016.
 March 18 – 20: 2016 Women's Handball Olympic Qualifying event #2 in  Metz
  has qualified to compete at Rio 2016.
 March 18 – 20: 2016 Women's Handball Olympic Qualifying event #3 in  Aarhus
  and  both qualified to compete at Rio 2016.
 April 8 – 10: 2016 Men's Handball Olympic Qualifying event #1 in  Gdańsk
  and  both qualified to compete at Rio 2016.
 April 8 – 10: 2016 Men's Handball Olympic Qualifying event #2 in  Malmö
  and  both qualified to compete at Rio 2016.
 April 8 – 10: 2016 Men's Handball Olympic Qualifying event #3 in  Herning
  and  both qualified to compete at Rio 2016.
 June 27 – July 3: 2016 World University Handball Championship in  Antequera
 Men:  defeated , 28–20, in the final.  took third place.
 Women:  defeated , 20–14, in the final.  took third place.
 July 3 – 15: 2016 Women's Junior World Handball Championship in  Moscow
  defeated , 32–28 in overtime, to win their second Women's Junior World Handball Championship title.
  took third place.
 July 12 – 17: 2016 Beach Handball World Championships for Men and Women in  Budapest
 Men:  defeated , 2–0, to win their second Beach Handball World Championships title.  took third place.
 Women:  defeated , 2–1, to win their first Women's Beach Handball World Championships title.
  took third place.
 July 19 – 31: 2016 Women's Youth World Handball Championship in 
  defeated , 30–22, to win their second Women's Youth World Handball Championship title. 
  took third place.
 September 5 – 8: 2016 IHF Super Globe in  Doha
  Füchse Berlin defeated  Paris Saint-Germain, 29–28, to win their second consecutive IHF Super Globe title.
  Vive Targi Kielce took third place.

Ice hockey

Judo

Kabaddi

 Major Leagues

 International Tournaments

Korfball

Europe
 January 13 – 16: IKF Europa Cup 2016 (final round) in  Budapest
 In the final  PKC/SWKGroep defeated  Boeckenberg KC 31–21.  NC Benfica took third place.
 January 22 – 24: IKF Europa Shield 2016 in  Castrop-Rauxel
 In the final  Korfbal Club Barcelona defeated  Bec Korfball Club 15–14.  Schweriner-Korfball-Club '67 e.V. took third place.
 June 3 – 5: IKF European Korfball Championship Qualfiquation Round 1 West in  Saint-Étienne
 June 3 – 5: IKF European Korfball Championship Qualfiquation Round 1 East in  Nitra
 August 10 – 13: 1st IKF U15 European Korfball Championship in  Dunakeszi
 The  defeated the  1, 10–7.
 October 22 – 30: 2016 IKF European Korfball Championship in  Dordrecht
 In the final,  defeated , 27–14.  took third place.

North America
 June 15 – 19: Copa Internacional de Korfball in  Santo Domingo
1. 
2. 
3. 
4. 

Asia
 August 26 – September 3: 4th IKF Asia Korfball Championship in 
 In the final,  defeated , 39–14.  took third place.

World championships and World Cups
 March 18 – 20: U17 Korfball World Cup in  Schijndel
  beating the  squad in the final 26–12.  took third place
 March 25 – 27: U19 Korfball World Cup in  Leeuwarden
  beating the  squad in the final 22–18.  took third place
 July 9 – 16: IKF U23 World Korfball Championship in  Olomouc
  beating the  squad in the final 24–16.  took third place.

Lacrosse
 July 7 – 16: Under-19 World Lacrosse Championships in  Coquitlam
  defeated  13–12, to win their eighth consecutive Men's U-19 World Lacrosse Championship.  took third place.
 July 28 – August 6: 2016 European Lacrosse Championship in  Gödöllő
  defeated  7–6, to win their fourth consecutive Men's European Lacrosse Championships.  took third place.

Major League Lacrosse
 April 23 – August 20: 2016 Major League Lacrosse season
  Denver Outlaws defeated  Ohio Machine, 19–18.
 MVP:  Eric Law

NCAA Lacrosse Championship
 May 28 – 30: 2016 NCAA Division I Men's Lacrosse Championship (semifinals and final at Lincoln Financial Field in  Philadelphia)
  North Carolina defeated  Maryland 14–13.
 Most Outstanding Player:  Chris Cloutier (North Carolina)
 May 28 & 29: 2016 NCAA Division II Men's Lacrosse Championship in  Philadelphia
  Le Moyne defeated  Limestone 8–4.
 Most Outstanding Player:  Brendan Entenmann (Le Moyne)
 May 28 & 29: 2016 NCAA Division III Men's Lacrosse Championship in  Philadelphia
  Salisbury defeated  Tufts 14–13.
 Most Outstanding Player:  Colin Reymann (Salisbury)
 May 27 – 29: 2016 NCAA Division I Women's Lacrosse Championship (semifinals and final at Talen Energy Stadium in  Chester, Pennsylvania)
  North Carolina defeated  Maryland 13–7.
 Most Outstanding Player:  Aly Messinger (North Carolina)
 May 19 – 21: 2016 NCAA Division II Women's Lacrosse Championship in  Denver
  Florida Southern defeated  Adelphi 8–7.
 Most Outstanding Player:  Taylor Gillis (Florida Southern)
 May 28 & 29: 2016 NCAA Division III Women's Lacrosse Championship in  Philadelphia
  Middlebury defeated  Trinity (CT) 9–5.
 Most Outstanding Player:  Katie Mandigo (Middlebury)

NLL
 January 1 – June 2016: 2016 NLL season
  Saskatchewan Rush defeated  Buffalo Bandits, 2–0 in the final.
 MVP:  Aaron Bold

WCLA
 May 4 – 7: 2016 WCLA Division I National Championship in  Winston-Salem
 In the final  Georgia defeated  Minnesota 8–7.  Colorado Buffaloes took third place.
Division I Individual Awards
 Most Outstanding Attacker –  Arden Birdwell (Georgia Bulldogs)
 Most Outstanding Midfielder –  Allie Thalhuber (Minnesota)
 Most Outstanding Defender –  Meredith Butler Georgia Bulldogs
 Most Outstanding Goalie –  Hannah Gilbert (Minnesota)
 May 6 – 7: 2016 WCLA Division II National Championship in  Winston-Salem
 In the final  Denver defeated  Utah 11–10.  Loyola took third place.
Division II Individual Awards
 Most Outstanding Attacker –  Kaitlin Ball (Denver)
 Most Outstanding Midfielder –  Audrey Burns (Utah)
 Most Outstanding Defender –  Nicole Cosmany (Denver)
 Most Outstanding Goalie –  Sasha McKee (Utah)

Luge

Mixed martial arts

Modern pentathlon

Motorsport

Mountain bike racing

Multi-sport events
 February 5 – 16: 2016 South Asian Games in  Guwahati and Shillong
  won both the gold and overall medal tallies.
 March 6 – 11: 2016 Arctic Winter Games in / Nuuk
  won both the gold and overall medal tallies.
 June 29 – July 3: 2016 IWAS U23 World Games in  Prague
 For results, click here.
 July 10 – 19: 2016 ASEAN University Games in 
  won both the gold and overall medal tallies.
 July 12 – 25: 2016 European Universities Games in  Zagreb and Rijeka
  University of Zagreb won both the gold and overall medal tallies.
 July 21 – 29: 2016 ASEAN School Games in  Chiang Mai
  won both the gold and overall medal tallies.
 September 24 – October 3: 2016 Asian Beach Games in  Da Nang
  won both the gold and overall medal tallies.
 November 24 – December 3: 2016 Bolivarian Beach Games in  Iquique
  won both the gold and overall medal tallies.

Nordic combined

Olympic Games 
 February 12 – 21: 2016 Winter Youth Olympics in  Lillehammer
 The  and  won ten gold medals each. However, the United States finished first, due to winning more silver medals than South Korea.
  won the overall medal tally.
 August 5 – 21: 2016 Summer Olympics in  Rio de Janeiro
 The  won both the gold and overall medal tallies.

Paralympic Games 
 September 7 – 18: 2016 Summer Paralympics in  Rio de Janeiro

  won both the gold and overall medal tallies.

Padel
International Padel Federation Calendar

2016 World Padel Tour

 March 27 – December 14: 2016 World Padel Tour
 March 27 – April 3:  Gijón Open
 Winners:  Fernando Belasteguín &  Pablo de Lima
 April 16 – 24:  Valencia Master
 Men's winners:  Francisco Navarro Compán &  Sanyo Gutiérrez
 Women's winners:  Alejandra Salazar &  Marta Marrero
 April 30 – May 8:  Barcelona Master
 Men's winners:  Fernando Belasteguín &  Pablo de Lima
 Women's winners:  Patty Llaguno &  Elisabeth Amatriaín
 May 12 – 14:  Rome Exhibition
 Winners:  Francisco Navarro Compán &  Sanyo Gutiérrez
 May 22 – 29:  Las Rozas de Madrid Open
 Men's winners:  Fernando Belasteguín &  Pablo de Lima
 Women's winners:  Alejandra Salazar &  Marta Marrero
 May 30 – June 6:  Lisbon Chellenger
 Winners:  Matías Marina &  Alejandro Ruiz Granados
 June 19 – 26:  Palma Open
 Men's winners:  Fernando Belasteguín &  Pablo de Lima
 Women's winners:  Majo Sánchez Alayeto &  Mapi Sánchez Alayeto
 June 26 – July 3:  Barcelona Chellenger
 Men's winners:  Gonzalo Rubio &  Javier Ruiz
 Women's winners:  Catalina Tenorio &  Victoria Iglesias
 July 3 – 10:  Valladolid Open
 Men's winners:  Fernando Belasteguín &  Pablo de Lima
 Women's winners:  Majo Sánchez Alayeto &  Mapi Sánchez Alayeto
 July 24 – 31:  Gran Canaria Open
 Men's winners:  Fernando Belasteguín &  Pablo de Lima
 Women's winners:  Alejandra Salazar &  Marta Marrero
 August 7 – 14:  Costa del Sol Chellenger
 Winners:  Federico Quiles &  Franco Stupaczuk
 August 21 – 28:  La Nucía Open
 Men's winners:  Francisco Navarro Compán &  Sanyo Gutiérrez
 Women's winners:  Majo Sánchez Alayeto &  Mapi Sánchez Alayeto
 September 5 – 11:  Monte Carlo Master
 Men's winners:  Fernando Belasteguín &  Pablo de Lima
 Women's winners:  Alejandra Salazar &  Marta Marrero
 September 11 – 18:  Madrid Chellenger
 Winners:  Gonzalo Godo Díaz &  Luciano Capra
 September 18 – 25:  Sevilla Open
 Men's winners:  Fernando Belasteguín &  Pablo de Lima
 Women's winners:  Alejandra Salazar &  Marta Marrero
 October 9 – 16:  A Coruña Open
 Men's winners:  Fernando Belasteguín &  Pablo de Lima
 Women's winners:  Alejandra Salazar &  Marta Marrero
 October 23 – 30:  Zaragoza Open
 Men's winners:  Fernando Belasteguín &  Pablo de Lima
 Women's winners:  Alejandra Salazar &  Marta Marrero
 November 7 – 13:  Buenos Aires Master
 Men's winners:  Fernando Belasteguín &  Pablo de Lima
 November 25 – 27:  Miami Exhibition
 November 27 – December 4:  Basque Country Open
 December 14 – 18:  Madrid Master (final)

World Championship
 November 14 – 20: Padel Tennis World Championship in  Lisboa
 Men's winners:  Álvaro Cepero Rodríguez &  Juan Lebrón Chincoa
 Women's winners:  Alejandra Salazar &  Marta Marrero

Radio-controlled racing

Racquetball

Road cycling

Roller skating

FIRS
 June 1 – 5: 2016 World Inline Hockey Masters Cup in  Bolzano
 Master Cup winner: 
 Veteran Cup winner: 
 June 4 – 5: 2016 Inline Alpine Slalom and Parallel Slalom World Championships in  Unterensingen and  Villablino
 Slalom winners:  Katharina Hoffmann &  Kristaps Zvejnieks
 Parallel Slalom winners:  Claudia Wittmann &  Davis Zvejnieks
 World Cup winners:  Jana Börsig &  Marco Walz
 June 12 – 25: 2016 World Inline Hockey Championships in  Asiago/Roana
 Men's: In the final,  defeated , 4–0.  took third place.
 Women's: In the final,  defeated , 3–1.  took third place.
 Junior men: In the final,  defeated , 5–4.  took third place.
 Junior women: In the final,  defeated , 2–0.  took third place.
 September 10 – 18: World Roller Speed Skating Championships in  Nanjing
  won both the gold and overall medal tallies.
 September 24 – October 1: 2016 FIRS Women's Roller Hockey World Cup in  Iquique
 In the final,  defeated , after , 3–2.  took third place.
 September 28 – October 8: Artistic Skating World Championship in  Novara
 Seniors Figures winners:  Markus Lell (m) /  Anabella Mendoz (f)
 Juniors Figures winners:  Deven Jacobson (m) /  Giselle Soler (f)
 Inline Seniors winners:  Yi-Fan Chen (m) /  Natalie Motley (f)
 Inline Juniors winners:  Collin Motley (m) /  Anastasia Nosova (f)
 Seniors Solo Dance winners:  Daniel Morandin (m) /  Silvia Stibilj (f)
 Juniors Solo Dance winners:  José Cruz (m) /  Martina Camana (f)
 Senior Couples Dance winners:  (Alessandro Spigai & Elena Leoni)
 Junior Couples Dance winners:  (Benson Kuan & Cassandra Seidel)
 November 17 – 21: 2016 Inline Freestyle World Championships in  Bangkok
 Free Jump winners:  Thomas Rataud (m) /  Maëliss Conan (f)
 Battle Slide winners:  Huang Haiyang (m) /  Nichakan Chinupun (f)
 Senior Battle Slalom winners:  Sergey Timchenko (m) /  Daria Kuznetsova (f)
 Junior Battle Slalom winners:  Zhang Hao (m) /  Liu Jiaxin (f)
 Senior Classic Slalom winners:  Sergey Timchenko (m) /  Mang Yun (f)
 Junior Classic Slalom winners:  Zhang Hao (m) /  Sofia Bogdanova (f)
 Senior Speed Slalom winners:  Pan Yusuo (m) /  Barbara Bossi (f)
 Junior Speed Slalom winners:  Pedram Ranjbar Vakili (m) /  Lo Pei Yu (f)

CERH
 October 24, 2015 – May, 15: 2015–16 CERH European League
 In the final,  S.L. Benfica defeated  U.D. Oliveirense, 5–3, to win their second European League.
 October 24, 2015 – May 1: 2015–16 CERS Cup
 In the final,  ÓC Barcelos defeated  CP Vilafranca, 6–3, to win their second CERS Cup.
 November 29, 2015 – March 20: 2015–16 CERH Women's European Cup
 In the final,  CP Voltregà defeated  Manlleu, after regular game, 4–4 and penalties 2–1, to win their 4th title.
 March 24 – 26: U23 Latin Cup in  Follonica
 1. 
 2. 
 3. 
 April 28 – 30: 2016 Show and Precision European Championships in  Matosinhos
  win's overall gold medals.
 July 11 – 16: 2016 CERH European Championship in  Oliveira de Azeméis
  defeated , 6–2, to win their twenty one CERH European Championship.   took third place.
 August 25 – September 3: 2016 Cadet/Youth/Junior/Senior European Championships in  Freiburg
  won both the gold and overall medal tallies.
 November 1 – 5: 2016 Cup of Europe Calderara Di Reno in 
  and  won both the gold and overall medal tallies.

Rowing

Rugby union

2016 Summer Olympics (WR)
 March 5 & 6: Aquece Rio International Women's Rugby Sevens 2016 in  Rio de Janeiro (Olympic Test Event)
 Winner: 
 Second: 
 Third: 
 June 18 & 19: 2016 Men's Rugby Sevens Final Olympic Qualification Tournament in  Fontvieille, Monaco
 Cup Winner: 
 Cup Second: 
 Cup Third: 
 Plate winner: 
 Bowl winner:  
 Shield winner: 
 August 6 – 11: 2016 Summer Olympics (rugby sevens) in  Rio de Janeiro
 Men:  ;  ;  
 Women:  ;  ;  

International rugby events
 February 5 – March 18: 2016 Six Nations Under 20s Championship
 Champions:  (first Six Nations Under 20s Championship title)
 Second: 
 Third: 
 February 5 – March 20: 2016 Women's Six Nations Championship
 Champions:  (fifth Women's Six Nations Championship title)
 Second: 
 Third: 
 February 6 – March 6: 2016 Americas Rugby Championship (debut event)
 Winner:  (inaugural Americas Rugby Championship title)
 Second: 
 Third: 
 February 6 – March 19: 2016 Six Nations Championship
 Champions:  (fifth Six Nations Championship title)
 Grand Slam: 
 Triple Crown: 
 Calcutta Cup: 
 Millennium Trophy: 
 Centenary Quaich: 
 Giuseppe Garibaldi Trophy: 
 March 8 – 21: 2016 World Rugby Pacific Challenge in 
 Champions:  Fiji Warriors (sixth World Rugby Pacific Challenge title)
 Second:  Samoa A
 Third:  Tonga A
 June 7 – 25: 2016 World Rugby Under 20 Championship in  Manchester
  defeated , 45–21, to win their third World Rugby Under 20 Championship title.  took third place.
 July 6 – 9: 2016 FISU World University Rugby Sevens Championship in  Swansea
 Men:  defeated , 24–20, in the final.  took third place.
 Women:  defeated , 31–5, in the final.  took third place.
 August 27 – October 8: 2016 Rugby Championship
 Winner: ; 2. ; 3. ; 4. 

2016 Men's Internationals
 April 30 – June 26: WR's 2016 Men's Internationals Page

2016 Women's Internationals
 October 22 – December 17: WR's 2016 Women's Internationals Page

2015–16 World Rugby Sevens Series

 Overall champions: 
 Second: 
 Third: 

2015–16 World Rugby Women's Sevens Series

 Overall champions: 
 Second: 
 Third: 

Club seasons and championships
 November 13, 2015 – May 14: 2015–16 European Rugby Champions Cup
 Final in  Décines:  Saracens defeated  Racing 92 21–9 for their first-ever European club title.
 November 12, 2015 – May 13: 2016–17 European Rugby Challenge Cup
 Final in  Décines:  Montpellier defeated  Harlequins 26–19 for their first-ever Challenge Cup title.
 October 16, 2015 – May 28:  2015–16 Aviva Premiership
 Final in London: Saracens defeated Exeter Chiefs 28–20 for their second straight title and third overall.
 September 5, 2015 – May 28: /// 2015–16 Guinness Pro12
 Grand Final in  Edinburgh: In a matchup of Irish teams, Connacht defeated Leinster 20–10 for their first-ever championship.
 August 22, 2015 – June 4:  2015–16 Top 14
 Final in  Barcelona: In a match moved from its traditional site of Stade de France due to scheduling conflicts with UEFA Euro 2016, Racing 92 defeated Toulon 29–21 for their first title since 1990 and sixth overall. The crowd of 99,124 was the largest ever for a domestic club match in the sport's history.
 February 26 – August 6: //// 2016 Super Rugby season
 Final in  Wellington: In a matchup between teams from New Zealand's North Island, the  defeated the  20–3 for their second straight title, and also second overall.

Sailing

Shooting
 January 4 – November 20: ISSF Competition Calendar

2016 Summer Olympics (ISSF)
 August 6 – 14: 2016 Summer Olympics in  Rio de Janeiro at the National Shooting Center
 Men Men's 10 metre Air Pistol:   Hoàng Xuân Vinh (OR);   Felipe Almeida Wu;   Pang Wei
 Men's 10 metre Air Rifle:   Niccolò Campriani (OR);   Serhiy Kulish;   Vladimir Maslennikov
 Men's 25 metre Rapid Fire Pistol:   Christian Reitz;   Jean Quiquampoix;   Li Yuehong
 Men's 50 metre Pistol:   Jin Jong-oh (OR);   Hoàng Xuân Vinh;   Kim Song-guk
 Men's 50 metre Rifle Prone:   Henri Junghänel (OR);   Kim Jong-hyun;   Kirill Grigoryan
 Men's 50 metre Rifle Three Positions:   Niccolò Campriani;   Sergey Kamenskiy;   Alexis Raynaud
 Men's Skeet:   Gabriele Rossetti;   Marcus Svensson;   Abdullah Al-Rashidi (Kuwait)
 Men's Trap:   Josip Glasnović;   Giovanni Pellielo;   Edward Ling
 Men's Double Trap:   Fehaid Al-Deehani (Kuwait);   Marco Innocenti;   Steven Scott
 Women Women's 10 metre Air Pistol:   Zhang Mengxue (OR);   Vitalina Batsarashkina;   Anna Korakaki
 Women's 10 metre Air Rifle:   Virginia Thrasher (OR''');   Du Li;   Yi Siling
 Women's 25 metre Pistol:   Anna Korakaki;   Monika Karsch;   Heidi Diethelm Gerber
 Women's 50 metre Rifle Three Positions:   Barbara Engleder;   Zhang Binbin;   Du Li
 Women's Skeet:   Diana Bacosi;   Chiara Cainero;   Kim Rhode
 Women's Trap:   Catherine Skinner;   Natalie Rooney;   Corey Cogdell

International shooting championships
 January 25 – February 3: 2016 Asian Olympic Shooting Qualifying Tournament in  New Delhi
 Note: This event was named as the alternate qualification one for Rio 2016 from the one staged in Kuwait last year.

  won the gold medal tally.  won the overall medal tally.
 February 22 – 28: 10m European Shooting Championships in  Győr

  won both the gold and overall medal tallies.
 June 13 – 19: 2016 European Junior Shooting Championships in  Tallinn

  won both the gold and overall medal tallies.
 July 4 – 12: 2016 European Shotgun Championships in  Lonato del Garda

  won both the gold and overall medal tallies.
 July 15 – 23: 2016 World Running Target Championships in  Suhl

  won the gold medal tally. Ukraine and  won 15 overall medals each.
 September 14 – 18: 2016 World University Shooting Championship in  Bydgoszcz
  won the gold medal tally. India and the  won 7 overall medals each.

2016 ISSF World Cup
 March 1 – 9: Rifle and Pistol World Cup #1 in  Bangkok

  won both the gold and overall medal tallies.
 March 17 – 25: Shotgun World Cup #1 in  Nicosia
 Men's skeet winner:  Mykola Milchev
 Men's trap winner:  Alberto Fernández
 Men's double trap winner:  Alessandro Chianese
 Women's skeet winner:  Morgan Craft
 Women's trap winner:  Ray Bassil
 April 13 – 25: All Guns World Cup #1 in  Rio de Janeiro (Olympic Test Event)

China won the overall medal tally.
 May 19 – 26: Rifle and Pistol World Cup #2 in  Munich

  won both the gold and overall medal tallies.
 June 1 – 11: Shotgun World Cup #2 in the  City of San Marino
 Men's skeet winner:  Stefan Nilsson
 Men's trap winner:  Jiří Lipták
 Men's double trap winner:  Joshua Richmond
 Women's skeet winner:  Sutiya Jiewchaloemmit
 Women's trap winner:  Emma Elizabeth Cox
 June 20 – 29: All Guns World Cup #2 (final) in  Baku

  won the gold medal tally.  won the overall medal tally.
 October 4 – 10: Rifle and Pistol World Cup #3 (final) in  Bologna

  and  won 2 gold medals each. China won the overall medal tally.
 October 10 – 16: Shotgun World Cup #3 (final) in  Rome
 Men's skeet winner:  Nikolai Tiopliy
 Men's trap winner:  Giovanni Cernogoraz
 Men's double trap winner:  James Willett
 Women's skeet winner:  Kim Rhode
 Women's trap winner:  Natalie Rooney

Ski jumping

Snooker

Players Tour Championship
 June 16, 2015 – March 26, 2016: Players Tour Championship 2015/2016
 July 29 – August 2: European Tour 2015/2016 – Event 1 in  Riga
  Barry Hawkins defeated  Tom Ford 4–1.
 August 26 – 30: European Tour – Event 2 in  Fürth
  Ali Carter defeated  Shaun Murphy 4–3.
 October 7 – 11: European Tour – Event 3 in  Mülheim
  Rory McLeod defeated  Tian Pengfei 4–2.
 October 19 – 23: Asian Tour – Event 1 in  Haining
  Ding Junhui defeated  Ricky Walden 4–3.
 November 4 – 8: European Tour – Event 4 in  Sofia
  Mark Allen defeated  Ryan Day 4–0.
 December 9 – 13: European Tour – Event 5 in 
  Marco Fu defeated  Michael White 4–1.
 February 23 – 28: European Tour – Event 6 in  Gdynia
  Mark Selby defeated  Martin Gould 4–1.
 March 22 – 27: Players Tour Championship – Finals in Manchester
  Mark Allen defeated  Ricky Walden 10–6.

Snooker season
 May 7, 2015 – May 2, 2016: Snooker season 2015/2016
 May 7, 2015 – May 10, 2015: Vienna Snooker Open in  Vienna
  Peter Ebdon defeated  Mark King 5–3.
 June 22, 2015 – June 26, 2015: World Cup in  Wuxi
  defeated  4–1
 July 29 – July 5: 2015 Australian Goldfields Open in  Bendigo
  John Higgins defeated  Martin Gould 9–8.
 July 15 – 19: Pink Ribbon in  Gloucester
  Ronnie O'Sullivan defeated  Darryn Walker 4–2
 September 7 – 12: Six-red World Championship in  Bangkok
  Thepchaiya Un-Nooh defeated  Liang Wenbo 8–2.
 September 14 – 20: Shanghai Masters in  Shanghai
  Kyren Wilson defeated  Judd Trump 10–9.
 October 25 – November 1: 2015 International Championship in  Daqing
  John Higgins defeated  David Gilbert 10–5.
 November 10 – 15: 2015 Champion of Champions in  Coventry
  Neil Robertson defeated  Mark Allen 10–5.
 November 10–21: 2015 IBSF World Snooker Championship in  Hurghada
  Pankaj Advani defeated  Zhao Xintong 8–6.
 November 16–21: 2015 General Cup in Hong Kong
  Marco Fu defeated  Mark Williams 7–3.
 November 24 – December 6: 2015 UK Championship in  York
  Neil Robertson defeated  Liang Wenbo 10–5.
 January 10 – 17: 2016 Masters in  London
  Ronnie O'Sullivan defeated  Barry Hawkins 10–1.
 January 30 & 31: 2016 World Seniors Championship in  Preston
  Mark Davis defeated  Darren Morgan 2–1.
 February 3 – 7: 2016 German Masters in  Berlin
  Martin Gould def.  Luca Brecel 9–5.
 February 12 – 14: 2016 Snooker Shoot-Out in  Reading
  Robin Hull def.  Luca Brecel 1–0
 February 15 – 21: 2016 Welsh Open in  Cardiff
  Ronnie O'Sullivan defeated  Neil Robertson 9–5.
 January 4 – March 4: 2016 Championship League (final) in  Stock
  Judd Trump defeated  Ronnie O'Sullivan 3–2.
 March 8 – 13: 2016 World Grand Prix in  Llandudno
  Shaun Murphy defeated  Stuart Bingham 10–9.
 March 28 – April 3: 2016 China Open in  Beijing
  Judd Trump defeated  Ricky Walden 10–4.
 April 16 – May 2: 2016 World Snooker Championship in  Sheffield
  Mark Selby defeated  Ding Junhui 18–14.

Others in snooker 
 June 2 – 13: 2015 EBSA European Snooker Championship in  Prague
  Michael Wild defeated  Jamie Clarke 7–4.
 July 18 – 26: 2015 IBSF World Under-21 Snooker Championship in  Bucharest
  Boonyarit Keattikun defeated  Jamie Clarke 7–6.
 October 3 – 11: 2015 IBSF World Under-18 Snooker Championship in  St. Petersburg
  Ka Wai Cheung defeated  Ming Tung Chan 5–2.
 February 7 – 12: 2016 EBSA European Under-18 Snooker Championship in  Wrocław
  Tyler Rees defeated  Jackson Page 5–2.
 February 7 – 12: 2016 EBSA European Under-21 Snooker Championship in  Wrocław
  Josh Boileau defeated  Brandon Sargeant 6–1.
 February 12 – 21: 2016 EBSA European Snooker Championship in  Wrocław
  Jak Jones defeated  Jamie Clarke 7–4.
 March 1 – 8: 2016 ACBS Asian Under-21 Snooker Championship in  Colombo
  Wang Yuchen defeated  Ratchayothin Yotharuck 6–5.

Snowboarding

Softball

Softball World Cup and Championships
 July 5 – 10: 2016 World Cup of Softball in  Oklahoma City
 July 15 – 24: 2016 Women's Softball World Championship in  Surrey, British Columbia
 The  defeated , 7–3, to win their tenth Women's Softball World Championship title.
  took the bronze medal.
 July 22 – 30: 2016 ISF Junior Men's World Championship in  Midland, Michigan
  defeated , 2–1, to win their second ISF Junior Men's World Championship title.  took the bronze medal.

Little League Softball
 July 31 – August 6: 2016 Junior League Softball in  Kirkland, Washington
  ASOFEM LL (Team Latin America) defeated  Hampton LL (Team Canada), 8–6, in the final.
 July 31 – August 7: 2016 Senior League Softball in  Sussex County, Delaware
  Cape Coral Softball LL (Team Southeast) defeated  District 7 (Team Canada), 3–0, in the final.
 July 31 – August 7: 2016 Big League Softball in  Sussex County
  District 1 (Team Latin America) defeated  District 5 (Team Southwest), 10–7, in the final.
 August 10 –  17: 2016 Little League Softball in  Portland, Oregon
  Greater Helotes LL (Team Southwest) defeated  Rowan LL (Team Southeast), 5–1, in the final.

Speed skating

Squash

Table tennis

Taekwondo

Tennis

 January 3 – November 27: 2016 ATP World Tour (Men)
 January 3 – November 20: 2016 WTA Tour (Women)

2016 Summer Olympics (ATP and WTA)
 August 6 – 14: 2016 Summer Olympics in  Rio de Janeiro at the Olympic Tennis Centre
 Men's Singles:   Andy Murray;   Juan Martín del Potro;   Kei Nishikori
 Men's Doubles:
   (Marc López & Rafael Nadal)
   (Florin Mergea & Horia Tecău)
   (Steve Johnson & Jack Sock)
 Women's Singles:   Monica Puig;   Angelique Kerber;   Petra Kvitová
 Women's Doubles:
   (Ekaterina Makarova & Elena Vesnina)
   (Timea Bacsinszky & Martina Hingis)
   (Lucie Šafářová & Barbora Strýcová)
 Mixed Doubles:
   (Bethanie Mattek-Sands & Jack Sock)
   (Venus Williams & Rajeev Ram)
   (Lucie Hradecká & Radek Štěpánek)

International tennis competitions
 January 3 – 9: 2016 Hopman Cup in  Perth
  defeated , 2–0 in matches played, to win their second Hopman Cup title. 
 February 1 – November 13: 2016 Fed Cup
 The  defeated , 3–2 in matches played, to win their third consecutive and tenth overall Fed Cup title.
 March 5 – November 28: 2016 Davis Cup
  defeated , 3–2 in matches played, to win their first Davis Cup title.
 October 23 – 30: 2016 WTA Finals in 
 Women's Singles:  Dominika Cibulková
 Women's Doubles:  Ekaterina Makarova /  Elena Vesnina
 November 1 – 6: 2016 WTA Elite Trophy in  Zhuhai
 Women's Singles:  Petra Kvitová
 Women's Doubles:  İpek Soylu /  Xu Yifan
 November 13 – 20: 2016 ATP World Tour Finals in  London
 Men's Singles:  Andy Murray
 Men's Doubles:  Henri Kontinen /  John Peers

Grand Slam
 January 18 – 31: 2016 Australian Open in  Melbourne
 Men's Singles:  Novak Djokovic
 Men's Doubles:  Jamie Murray /  Bruno Soares
 Women's Singles:  Angelique Kerber
 Women's Doubles:  Martina Hingis /  Sania Mirza
 May 16 – June 5: 2016 French Open in  Paris
 Men's Singles:  Novak Djokovic
 Men's Doubles:  Feliciano López /  Marc López
 Women's Singles:  Garbiñe Muguruza
 Women's Doubles:  Caroline Garcia /  Kristina Mladenovic
 June 27 – July 10: 2016 Wimbledon Championships in  London
 Men's Singles:  Andy Murray
 Men's Doubles:  Pierre-Hugues Herbert /  Nicolas Mahut
 Women's Singles:  Serena Williams
 Women's Doubles:  Serena Williams /  Venus Williams
 August 29 – September 11: 2016 US Open in  New York City
 Men's Singles:  Stan Wawrinka
 Men's Doubles:  Jamie Murray /  Bruno Soares
 Women's Singles:  Angelique Kerber
 Women's Doubles:  Bethanie Mattek-Sands /  Lucie Šafářová

Track cycling

Trial cycling

Triathlon

Volleyball

Water polo

Weightlifting

Wrestling

Deaths

References 

 
Sports by year